

10001–10100 

|-
|-id=002
| 10002 Bagdasarian ||  || Aleksandr Sergeevich Bagdasaryan (born 1946), a radio and electronics engineer and director of a Moscow-based research corporation || 
|-id=003
| 10003 Caryhuang ||  || Cary K. Huang (born 1997) is an animator and educator known for his variety of animated web shows, coding projects, and data visualization videos. He and his twin brother created the popular online interactive size comparison tool "The Scale of the Universe" in 2010.|| 
|-id=004
| 10004 Igormakarov ||  || Igor' Mikhajlovich Makarov (born 1927) is known for his research on nonlinear and adaptive systems, artificial intelligence and the choice and acceptance of decisions. He was chief scientific secretary of the Russian Academy of Sciences during 1988–1996. || 
|-id=005
| 10005 Chernega ||  || Nikolaj Akimovich Chernega (born 1923), a specialist in astrometry and the compilation of catalogues of highly precise stellar coordinates. || 
|-id=006
| 10006 Sessai ||  || Nishiyama Sessai (1735–1798), a Confucian scholar in the Edo period, born at Kamogata, Okayama prefecture. || 
|-id=007
| 10007 Malytheatre ||  || Maly Theatre, Moscow (a.k.a. Ostrovsky's house and "The Second Moscow University"), the oldest Russian theater (founded in 1756) || 
|-id=008
| 10008 Raisanyo ||  || Rai San'yō (1780–1832), a Confucian scholar in the Edo period, born at Takehara, Hiroshima prefecture. || 
|-id=009
| 10009 Hirosetanso ||  || Hirose Tansō (1782–1856), a Confucian scholar in the Edo period, born at Hita, Oita prefecture. || 
|-id=010
| 10010 Rudruna ||  || RUDruNa, or Rossijskij Universitet Druzhby Narodov, is the Russian University of Friendship of Nations. || 
|-id=011
| 10011 Avidzba ||  || Anatolij Mkanovich Avidzba (born 1951), an orchardist and viticulturist. || 
|-id=012
| 10012 Tmutarakania ||  || Tmutarakania, a Russian principality in the Tamanian peninsula from the tenth to the twelfth centuries. || 
|-id=013
| 10013 Stenholm ||  || Björn Stenholm, Swedish astronomer at Lund Observatory has for many years worked on outreach activities in astronomy, notably as editor of the Swedish journal Populär Astronomi (IAU). || 
|-id=014
| 10014 Shaim ||  || Shaim, a town in the Tyumen province of the Russian Federation. In its environs the first oil field in western Siberia was discovered in 1959. || 
|-id=015
| 10015 Valenlebedev ||  || Valentin Lebedev (born 1942), Russian cosmonaut and author, founder and director of the Scientific Geoinformation Center of the Russian Academy of Sciences || 
|-id=016
| 10016 Yugan ||  || Yugan is the shortened name of Nefteyugansk, a town in western Siberia that is the center of the drilling operations of Ust'-Balyk and other oil fields. || 
|-id=017
| 10017 Jaotsungi ||  || Jao Tsung-I, (born 1917), a world-renowned sinologist, painter and calligrapher || 
|-id=018
| 10018 Lykawka ||  || Patryk Sofia Lykawka (born 1976) is a Brazilian-Italian planetary scientist and dynamicist whose contributions include modeling Edgeworth-Kuiper Belt formation and the dynamical evolution processes of mean motion resonances. || 
|-id=019
| 10019 Wesleyfraser ||  || Wesley C. Fraser (born 1981) is a researcher at Queen's University Belfast whose studies include the size distribution of Kuiper Belt objects to better constrain their formation. || 
|-id=020
| 10020 Bagenal ||  || Frances Bagenal (born 1954), a planetary scientist and professor at the University of Colorado, who has been a science team member for the Voyager, Galileo and New Horizons missions. || 
|-id=021
| 10021 Henja ||  || Karin Henja is a prolific constructor of the Swedish form of crossword puzzles. || 
|-id=022
| 10022 Zubov ||  || Vladimir Ivanovich Zubov (1930–2000), a Russian mathematician and mechanician. || 
|-id=023
| 10023 Vladifedorov ||  || Vladimir Dmitrievich Fedorov (born 1933), an outstanding Russian surgeon, scientist and professor. || 
|-id=024
| 10024 Marthahazen || 1980 EB || Martha L. Hazen (born 1931), American astronomer who maintained Harvard's photographic plate archive and edited the Harvard Announcement Cards precursors of IAU's CBATs || 
|-id=025
| 10025 Rauer ||  || Heike Rauer (born 1961), a German planetary astronomer, is known for her observational work on cometary comae, in particular that of comet C/1995 O1 (Hale-Bopp). She is currently working at the Institute of Space Sensor Technology and Planetary Exploration in Berlin on a project to search for extrasolar planetary systems. || 
|-id=026
| 10026 Sophiexeon ||  || Sophie Xeon (1986–2021), known as SOPHIE, was a highly influential Scottish singer, songwriter, and producer. || 
|-id=027
| 10027 Perozzi || 1981 FL || Ettore Perozzi (born 1957), of Telespazio, Rome, works on solar-system dynamics and on interplanetary mission analysis. He has been involved in the Cassini/Huygens mission and in proposals for missions to comets and minor planets. || 
|-id=028
| 10028 Bonus ||  || Shelley R. Bonus, American astronomer, creator of the "Janet Planet" and "Space E. Tracy" astronomy shows and lectures, assisted in organizing the photographic glass plate archive of the 1.2-m Schmidt Oschin Telescope at Palomar Observatory || 
|-id=029
| 10029 Hiramperkins || 1981 QF || Hiram Perkins (1833–1924), a professor of mathematics and astronomy at the Ohio Wesleyan University from 1857 to 1907. || 
|-id=030
| 10030 Philkeenan || 1981 QG || Philip Keenan (1908–2000), a professor of astronomy with the Ohio State University at Perkins Observatory from 1946 until his death. || 
|-id=031
| 10031 Vladarnolda ||  || Vladimir Arnold (born 1937), a Russian mathematician. The name was suggested by V. J. Judovich. || 
|-id=032
| 10032 Hans-Ulrich ||  || Hans-Ulrich Auster (born 1959) is Head of the Space Magnetometer Laboratory at Braunschweig Technical University, known for research and development of magnetometers aboard multiple spacecraft, including Rosetta's Philae lander. || 
|-id=033
| 10033 Bodewits ||  || Dennis Bodewits (born 1979) is a research scientist at the University of Maryland who performs observational studies of the activity and evolution of comets and active asteroids using the Swift gamma-ray burst space observatory. || 
|-id=034
| 10034 Birlan || 1981 YG || Mirel Birlan (born 1963), Romanian astronomer at Paris Observatory, began his career in 1991 as an astronomer at the Bucharest Observatory. He has conducted observing campaigns on minor Solar-System bodies and has been involved in groundbased science of Rosetta mission asteroid targets. The name was suggested by M. A. Barucci. || 
|-id=035
| 10035 Davidgheesling ||  || David Gheesling (1967–2020), of Roswell, GA (USA), was an astronomy and meteorite enthusiast, author, public speaker, and a member of the Board of Director of the International Meteorite Collectors Association. H || 
|-id=036
| 10036 McGaha || 1982 OF || James E. McGaha (born 1946), a Tucson astronomer, lecturer, U.S. Air Force pilot and skeptic, actively promotes science and the refutation of pseudoscience. || 
|-id=037
| 10037 Raypickard || 1984 BQ || Ray Pickard (born 1967), of Bathurst, NSW (Australia), is a teacher and academic. || 
|-id=038
| 10038 Tanaro ||  || Tanaro, longest river of Piedmont, Italy. || 
|-id=039
| 10039 Keet Seel || 1984 LK || Keet Seel, a prehistoric cliff dwelling located in Tsegi Canyon, in what is now the Navajo National Monument in northern Arizona; the name is from a Navajo phrase "kits'iil" or "kin ts'iil" meaning "houses that have been left behind" (1998 Flagstaff Festival of Science asteroid naming contest winner). The name was suggested by M. T. Gibson. || 
|-id=040
| 10040 Ghillar || 1984 QM || Ghillar Michael Anderson (born 1951), of Goodooga, NSW (Australia), is an Aboriginal elder, Senior Law Man, and leader of the Euahlayi people bordering northern New South Wales and southern Queensland. || 
|-id=041
| 10041 Parkinson ||  || Bradford Parkinson (born 1935) is an American engineer and inventor who led a team that developed the Global Positioning System with revolutionary tracking technology. || 
|-id=042
| 10042 Budstewart || 1985 PL || L. R. ("Bud") Stewart (1903–1979), a cofounder of the Columbus Astronomical Society in 1947 and its first president. || 
|-id=043
| 10043 Janegann || 1985 PN || Jane Gann (1910–1994), a cofounder and first female president of the Columbus Astronomical Society. || 
|-id=044
| 10044 Squyres || 1985 RU || Steven W. Squyres (born 1956), a professor of astronomy at Cornell University. || 
|-id=045
| 10045 Dorarussell ||  || Dora Oake Russell (1913–1986) was a Canadian writer and educator, who, in 1965, co-founded the St. John's Centre branch of the Royal Astronomical Society of Canada (RASC) in Newfoundland. She was awarded the Queen Elizabeth II Silver Jubilee Medal and the RASC Service Award in 1977, and wrote a weekly column on astronomy in The Evening Telegram. || 
|-id=046
| 10046 Creighton || 1986 JC || James M. Creighton (1856–1946), an American architect who designed "Old Main" at the University of Arizona || 
|-id=047
| 10047 Davidchapman ||  || David Chapman (born 1953) is a Canadian amateur astronomer and former oceanographer at the Defence Research and Development Canada, who was honored with the Simon Newcomb Award and the Service award of the Royal Astronomical Society of Canada (RASC) in 1986 and 2015, respectively. || 
|-id=048
| 10048 Grönbech || 1986 TQ || Danish observational astronomer Bent Grönbech (1947–1977) was known for the Grönbech-Olsen catalogues of complete Strömgren photometry of southern bright stars and for his research on eclipsing binaries, comets and minor planets. He published 36 scientific papers || 
|-id=049
| 10049 Vorovich ||  || Izrailevich Vorovich (born 1920), an academician of the Russian Academy of Sciences Iosif. || 
|-id=050
| 10050 Rayman ||  || Named for Marc D. Rayman (born 1956) || 
|-id=051
| 10051 Albee ||  || Arden L. Albee (born 1928), a Caltech professor of geology and planetary sciences. || 
|-id=052
| 10052 Nason ||  || Jymme Curtis (Curt) Nason (born 1953), co-founder of the Royal Astronomical Society of Canada New Brunswick Centre in 2000 || 
|-id=053
| 10053 Noeldetilly ||  || Rolland Noël de Tilly (1906–1983), long-time leader of the Royal Astronomical Society of Canada, Centre de Montréal || 
|-id=054
| 10054 Solomin ||  || Yurij Mefodievich Solomin (born 1935) is a Russian actor. || 
|-id=055
| 10055 Silcher ||  || German composer Friedrich Silcher (1789–1860) || 
|-id=056
| 10056 Johnschroer ||  || John A. Schroer IV (1956–2014) was a planetarium and space science educator for the Michigan Science Center in Detroit. He was also former president of the Great Lakes Planetarium Association and an amateur radio operator. || 
|-id=057
| 10057 L'Obel ||  || Matthias de l'Obel (Lobelius, 1538–1616), a Flemish physician and botanist. || 
|-id=058
| 10058 Ikwilliamson ||  || Isabel K. Williamson (1908–2000), was a Canadian observer of aurora and meteors, who won the Royal Astronomical Society of Canada's Chant Medal in 1948 || 
|-id=059
| 10059 McCullough ||  || Brian McCullough (born 1953) former president and vice president of the Ottawa Centre branch of the Royal Astronomical Society of Canada (RASC), and an active science communicator at the Canada Science and Technology Museum in Ottawa. || 
|-id=060
| 10060 Amymilne || 1988 GL || Named for Amy Rae Milne (born 1982), a Canadian environmentalist || 
|-id=061
| 10061 Ndolaprata ||  || Ndola de Jesus Veiga Prata (born 1965), Angolan medical doctor and public health expert and lecturer || 
|-id=062
| 10062 Kimhay ||  || Kimberley Dawn Hay (born 1959), a North American sketch artist and amateur astronomer, observer of sunspots and meteor showers, and contributor to AMS, AAVSO, ALPO, as well as the RASC. || 
|-id=063
| 10063 Erinleeryan ||  || Erin Lee Ryan (born 1981) is a research scientist with the SETI Institute whose work includes spectral and lightcurve observations of the Hilda asteroids. || 
|-id=064
| 10064 Hirosetamotsu || 1988 UO || Tamotsu Hirose (born 1931) is known as an astronomical leader throughout the four prefectures of the island of Shikoku. He began observing sunspots with a heliostat in 1949, after which he built his own private observatory for the continuous observation of sunspots.|| 
|-id=065
| 10065 Greglisk || 1988 XK || Greg Lisk (born 1963) Canadian amateur astronomer and president and organizer at RASC's Belleville Centre. In 2014, he was honored with the RASC Service Award (Src). || 
|-id=066
| 10066 Pihack ||  || Brian Pihack (born 1956), a Canadian chiropractor, amateur astronomer and president at RASC's Niagara Centre, where he has been giving astronomy lectures to the public of southern Ontario. || 
|-id=067
| 10067 Bertuch ||  || Friedrich Justin Bertuch (1747–1822), a German author and bookseller. || 
|-id=068
| 10068 Dodoens ||  || Rembertus Dodonaeus (1516–1585), a Flemish physician and botanist. || 
|-id=069
| 10069 Fontenelle ||  || Bernard Le Bovier, sieur de Fontenelle (1657–1757), known for his work Entretiens sur la pluralité des mondes (1686). || 
|-id=070
| 10070 Liuzongli ||  || Liu Zongli (born 1937), a professor of astronomy and astronomer at Beijing National Observatory. || 
|-id=071
| 10071 Paraguay ||  || Paraguay, a South American country bordered by Bolivia, Brazil and Argentina. || 
|-id=072
| 10072 Uruguay ||  || Uruguay, a country in the south eastern region of South America, bordered on the east by the Atlantic Ocean. || 
|-id=073
| 10073 Peterhiscocks ||  || Peter Hiscocks (1945–2018) was a Candadian amateur astronomer and electrical engineer at Ryerson University, Toronto, and an expert in light pollution abatement at RASC's Toronto Centre. || 
|-id=074
| 10074 Van den Berghe ||  || Frits Van den Berghe (1883–1939), a Belgian painter || 
|-id=075
| 10075 Campeche ||  || The Bay of Campeche is surrounded by the Mexican states of Campeche, Tabasco and Veracrux. || 
|-id=076
| 10076 Rogerhill || 1989 PK || Roger Hill (born 1955), 6 time past president, newsletter editor for 12 years and member of the RASC's Hamilton Centre for over 50 years. || 
|-id=077
| 10077 Raykoenig ||  || Raymond Koenig (1930–2007) was a Canadian physicist and astronomer, and a founding member of the RASC's Kitchener-Waterloo Centre. || 
|-id=078
| 10078 Stanthorpe ||  || Stanthorpe, Queensland's wine capital, Australia || 
|-id=079
| 10079 Meunier ||  || Constantin Meunier (1831–1905), a Belgian sculptor and painter. || 
|-id=080
| 10080 Macevans ||  || William MacDonald Evans (born 1942), a Canadian electrical engineer and former president of the Canadian Space Agency (1994–2001), recipient of NASA's Distinguished Public Service Medal, and a Member of the Order of Canada. He was born in Sarnia, Canada, completed his undergraduate studies at Queen's University, and received his Master of Science from the University of Birmingham. || 
|-id=081
| 10081 Dantaylor ||  || Daniel Taylor (born 1958) a Canadian amateur astronomer from Ontario, and former president of RASC's Windsor Centre, who is active in the abatement of light pollution on a national level. || 
|-id=082
| 10082 Bronson ||  || Ted Arthur Bronson (born 1952), a Canadian amateur astronomer and former president of RASC's Thunder Bay Centre. In 2006, he received a RASC Service Award. || 
|-id=083
| 10083 Gordonanderson ||  || Gordon "Jay" Anderson (born 1947), a former meteorologist, eclipsophile, and author, who served as Editor of the Journal of the Royal Astronomical Society of Canada for 10 years. || 
|-id=084
| 10084 Rossparker ||  || Ross Parker (born 1959), a Canadian amateur astronomer and historian, who is a member of RASC's Regina Centre. || 
|-id=085
| 10085 Jekennedy ||  || John Edward Kennedy (1916–1999), a Canadian physicist who was a charter member of the Canadian Astronomical Society (CASCA). || 
|-id=086
| 10086 McCurdy || 1990 SZ || Bruce Jefferson McCurdy (born 1955) a Canadian amateur astronomer in Edmonton, who was honored with the 2007 Service Award of the Royal Astronomical Society of Canada (RASC) for his contributions to community outreach and his publications. || 
|-id=087
| 10087 Dechesne ||  || Roland George Dechesne (born 1960), a Canadian amateur astronomer, former president of the Ottawa Centre branch of the Royal Astronomical Society of Canada (RASC), organizer of the "Barbecue Under the Stars" event in Calgary, and a leading member of RASC's Light Pollution Abatement Committee, who was honored with the Fellowship of the Royal Astronomical Society of Canada in 2021 for his lifetime of service to the Society. || 
|-id=088
| 10088 Digne ||  || Digne, a town in southern France || 
|-id=089
| 10089 Turgot ||  || Anne Robert Jacques Turgot (1727–1781), a French economist. || 
|-id=090
| 10090 Sikorsky ||  || Igor Sikorsky (1889–1972), an aircraft designer. || 
|-id=091
| 10091 Bandaisan ||  || Mount Bandai, Japanese active volcano in Fukushima prefecture || 
|-id=092
| 10092 Sasaki ||  || Katsuhiro Sasaki (born 1941), the director of the Department of Science and Engineering, National Science Museum, Tokyo. || 
|-id=093
| 10093 Diesel ||  || Rudolf Diesel (1858–1913), a German thermal engineer and inventor of the diesel engine. || 
|-id=094
| 10094 Eijikato || 1991 DK || Eiji Kato (born 1942) || 
|-id=095
| 10095 Carlloewe ||  || Carl Loewe (1796–1869), a German composer was an organist and director of the Pomeranian music festivals in Stettin. || 
|-id=096
| 10096 Colleenohare ||  || Colleen O'Hare (born 1955), member of the Okanagan Centre branch of the Royal Astronomical Society of Canada (RASC), who won the 2012 Qilak Award and the RASC Service Award in 2018. || 
|-id=097
| 10097 Humbroncos ||  || In memory of the sixteen people killed in the Humboldt Broncos bus crash near Armley, Saskatchewan, Canada, in 2018. || 
|-id=098
| 10098 Jaymiematthews ||  || Jaymie Matthews (born 1958), a Canadian astrophysicist, asteroseismologist, and a principal investigator for the MOST spacecraft. He is a member of the University of British Columbia and was made an Officer of the Order of Canada. || 
|-id=099
| 10099 Glazebrook ||  || Karl Glazebrook (born 1965), an astronomer at Johns Hopkins University. || 
|-id=100
| 10100 Bürgel ||  || Bruno H. Bürgel (1875–1948), a German shoemaker and astronomical writer || 
|}

10101–10200 

|-
| 10101 Fourier ||  || Joseph Fourier (1768–1830), a French mathematician who exerted a strong influence on mathematical physics through his Théorie analytique de la chaleur (1822), wherein he showed that the conduction of heat in solid bodies may be analyzed in terms of infinite mathematical series, the so-called "Fourier series". In 1798 he accompanied Napoleon to Egypt, where he was engaged, until 1801, in extensive research on Egyptian antiquities. || 
|-id=102
| 10102 Digerhuvud ||  || Digerhuvud, a place on the island of Gotland, Sweden, where seastacks are most common. || 
|-id=103
| 10103 Jungfrun ||  || Jungfrun, largest stack on Gotland island, Sweden || 
|-id=104
| 10104 Hoburgsgubben ||  || Hoburgsgubben is a seastack on southern Gotland, Sweden, looking like an old man watching the sea. || 
|-id=105
| 10105 Holmhällar ||  || Holmhällar a place on the island of Gotland, Sweden, contains an unusual area of seastacks. One of the expeditions from the Uppsala Observatory to the total solar eclipse on 1954 June 30 was based there. || 
|-id=106
| 10106 Lergrav ||  || Lergrav, a settlement with stacks on the island of Gotland, Sweden. || 
|-id=107
| 10107 Kenny ||  || Kenneth Robert Steel (1929–), the father of British discoverer Duncan Steel || 
|-id=108
| 10108 Tomlinson || 1992 HM || Ray Tomlinson (1941–2016) an American computer programmer who implemented the first email program on the ARPANET system, the precursor to the Internet, in 1971 || 
|-id=109
| 10109 Sidhu || 1992 KQ || Jaskarn Singh "Sid" Sidhu (born 1938), member of the Victoria Centre branch of the Royal Astronomical Society of Canada (RASC), who received the RASC President's Award in 2010. || 
|-id=111
| 10111 Fresnel ||  || Augustin-Jean Fresnel (1788–1827), French physicist who constructed the so-called "Fresnel lens". || 
|-id=114a lens surface into concentric rings. 
| 10114 Greifswald || 1992 RZ || Greifswald || 
|-id=116
| 10116 Robertfranz ||  || Robert Franz (1815–1892), a German composer || 
|-id=117
| 10117 Tanikawa || 1992 TW || Kiyotaka Tanikawa (born 1944) is an associate professor at the National Astronomical Observatory of Japan who specializes in the study of the three-body problem || 
|-id=119
| 10119 Remarque ||  || Erich Maria Remarque (1898–1970) German novelist, chiefly known for his Im Westen nichts Neues ("All Quiet on the Western Front", 1929). || 
|-id=120
| 10120 Ypres ||  || The Belgian city of Ypres, with Bruges and Ghent, controlled Flanders in the 13th century. Within the bulge of the British lines during World War I, Ypres was completely destroyed, subsequently to be rebuilt in its original style. || 
|-id=121
| 10121 Arzamas ||  || Arzamas, Russia, on the Tesha River || 
|-id=122
| 10122 Fröding ||  || Gustav Fröding, 19th-century Swedish poet and journalist, several of whose poems were set to music by Sibelius || 
|-id=123
| 10123 Fideöja ||  || Fide and Öja, two small towns on the Swedish island of Gotland. The church in Öja hosts a crucifix from the thirteenth century. || 
|-id=124
| 10124 Hemse ||  || Hemse, the second largest town on the Swedish island of Gotland, is the central node of the southern region. || 
|-id=125
| 10125 Stenkyrka ||  || Stenkyrka, a coastal parish on Gotland, Sweden. It hosts one of the largest church towers on the island. In the church can be found the oldest dated gravestone on the island, from the year 1200. || 
|-id=126
| 10126 Lärbro ||  || Lärbro, a village on the island of Gotland, Sweden. || 
|-id=127
| 10127 Fröjel ||  || Fröjel, a small parish on the island of Gotland, Sweden. || 
|-id=128
| 10128 Bro ||  || Bro, is a small parish on the island of Gotland, Sweden, where an old cairn from the Bronze Age is found, said to be the burial site of Baldur. || 
|-id=129
| 10129 Fole ||  || Fole, is a small parish on the island of Gotland, Sweden. || 
|-id=130
| 10130 Ardre ||  || Ardre is a small parish on the eastern side of the island of Gotland, Sweden. || 
|-id=131
| 10131 Stånga ||  || Stånga, a place on the island of Gotland, Sweden, where annual summer games have been held since 1924 || 
|-id=132
| 10132 Lummelunda ||  || Lummelunda, a place north of Visby, on the island of Gotland, Sweden. || 
|-id=136
| 10136 Gauguin ||  || Paul Gauguin (1848–1903) || 
|-id=137
| 10137 Thucydides ||  || Thucydides (ca. 460-400 BC) || 
|-id=138
| 10138 Ohtanihiroshi ||  || Hiroshi Ohtani (born 1939) is a professor in the department of astronomy at Kyoto University. His research themes include observational and theoretical studies of interstellar matter and observational study of active galaxies, especially of Seyfert and related galaxies. || 
|-id=139
| 10139 Ronsard ||  || Pierre de Ronsard (1524–1585) || 
|-id=140
| 10140 Villon ||  || François Villon (1431–1463) || 
|-id=141
| 10141 Gotenba || 1993 VE || Gotenba is a city at the foot of Mt. Fuji. Every year it is the site of a star party that promotes astronomical activities in cooperation with amateur astronomers to spread astronomy to the public || 
|-id=142
| 10142 Sakka ||  || Kazuyuki Sakka (born 1943), the director of the Kyoto School of Computer Science, studied spectroscopic properties of galaxies and emission nebulae. He has also created software for astronomy education and popularization || 
|-id=143
| 10143 Kamogawa ||  || Kamogawa, a famous river in Japan, flows through the center of Kyoto city. Kamogawa has often appeared in Japanese literature and art || 
|-id=146
| 10146 Mukaitadashi ||  || Tadashi Mukai (born 1945), a professor in the department of earth and planetary sciences at Kobe University, is known for studies of near-earth objects || 
|-id=147
| 10147 Mizugatsuka ||  || Mizugatsuka is a Japanese park in the middle of the southern trail of Mount Fuji. The clear air makes it a mecca for amateur astronomers. || 
|-id=148
| 10148 Shirase ||  || The adventurer Nobu Shirase (1861–1946) was the first Japanese person to explore Antarctica, reaching latitude -80\rm o05' on 1912 Jan. 28 || 
|-id=149
| 10149 Cavagna || 1994 PA || Marco Cavagna (born 1958), an Italian amateur astronomer. He began observing comets, variable stars and occultations at an early age. In 1989 he was one of the promoters of the follow-up program, with special interest in NEOs, at Sormano Observatory. Cavagna introduced the discoverers to the Italian astrometric community during its first meeting, held in Verona in 1991. || 
|-id=151
| 10151 Rubens ||  || Peter Paul Rubens (1577–1640) || 
|-id=152
| 10152 Ukichiro ||  || Ukichiro Nakaya (1900–1962), professor of physics at Hokkaido University, studied the crystalline structure of snow and in 1935 succeeded in making artificial snow for the first time || 
|-id=153
| 10153 Goldman || 1994 UB || Stuart J. Goldman (born 1963), associate editor of Sky & Telescope || 
|-id=154
| 10154 Tanuki || 1994 UH || Lake Tanuki is an artificial pond to the east of Mt. Fuji. Amateur astronomers gather at its shores for observation || 
|-id=155
| 10155 Numaguti ||  || Atusi Numaguti (1963–2001), an associate professor at Hokkaido University, was actively involved in research on the earth's hydrological cycle. The Atmospheric General Circulation Model he established is now used as a standard in Asia. He founded a summer school for young meteorologists || 
|-id=157
| 10157 Asagiri ||  || Asagiri Highlands are located at the west side of Mt. Fuji in Shizuoka prefecture. || 
|-id=158
| 10158 Taroubou || 1994 XK || Tarobou Highland is located at the west side of Mt. Fuji, in Gotenba City, Shizuoka prefecture. || 
|-id=159
| 10159 Tokara ||  || The Tokara Islands form an archipelago in southern Japan. It includes seven inhabited and five uninhabited islands || 
|-id=160
| 10160 Totoro ||  || Hayao Miyazaki produced the animated movie My Neighbor Totoro in 1988 || 
|-id=161
| 10161 Nakanoshima ||  || Nakanoshima, largest island in the Tokara Islands, Japan, containing Mount Ontake (Tokara Fuji) || 
|-id=162
| 10162 Issunboushi || 1995 AL || The extraordinarily small character Issunboushi---Issun means about 3 cm in old Japanese---was the hero of many old Japanese tales. Born the size of a bean, he defeated ogres, succeeded in a stratagem that got him a beautiful bride, and shook a mallet that instantly transformed him into a normal young man || 
|-id=163
| 10163 Onomichi ||  || The Japanese city of Onomichi near Hiroshima || 
|-id=164
| 10164 Akusekijima ||  || Akusekijima, an island in the Tokara Islands, Japan, known for its hot spring. The dense subtropical forest is believed to be the home of the gods that guard the mountainous island, and many shrines have been built to worship the gods. || 
|-id=166
| 10166 Takarajima ||  || Takarajima, southernmost inhabited island of the Tokara Islands, Japan, famous as the model of Robert Louis Stevenson's Treasure Island.|| 
|-id=167
| 10167 Yoshiwatiso ||  || Yoshikazu Watanabe (born 1953; Iso was his mother's maiden name) was a leading meteor observer in Japan. He is a council member of the Oriental Astronomical Association and a successful surveyor of historical records of comets and meteors in the modern Japanese era. The name was suggested by the discoverer and I. Hasegawa. || 
|-id=168
| 10168 Stony Ridge || 1995 CN || The founders of the Stony Ridge Observatory, the amateur astronomers Anthony L. Bland, Norman L. Boltz, Charles Buzzetti, George A. Carroll, Roy R. Cook, Alvin E. Cram, Roy K. Ensign, W. H. Griffith, Harold J. Ireland, J. George Moyen, Norris A. Roberts, Easy Sloman, John Sousa, John Terlep and Dave Thomas. The observatory is located near Los Angeles in the United States. Starting in 1964, the observatory was used by the Aeronautical Chart and Information Center in St. Louis to map potential landing sites for the Apollo space program. || 
|-id=169
| 10169 Ogasawara || 1995 DK || Located in the Pacific Ocean 1000 km south of Tokyo, the Ogasawara Islands (Bonin Islands), with their extraordinary natural environment, are dubbed the "Galapagos of the Orient". On the Titi-jima Island is the National Astronomical Observatory's Ogasawara Station of VERA (VLBI Exploration of Radio Astrometry) || 
|-id=170
| 10170 Petrjakeš ||  || Petr Jakeš, Czech geologist and geochemist † || 
|-id=171
| 10171 Takaotengu ||  || Takaotengu, legendary supernatural creature of Mount Takao, Japan. || 
|-id=172
| 10172 Humphreys ||  || Minnesota astronomer Roberta M. Humphreys (born 1944) is a leader in studies of physical properties of massive stars in the Milky Way and in nearby galaxies. She headed the Automated Plate Scanner Project to digitize the Palomar Sky Survey and make a publicly available database of a billion stars and several million galaxies || 
|-id=173
| 10173 Hanzelkazikmund || 1995 HA || Miroslav Zikmund (born 1920) and Jiří Hanzelka (born 1919). || 
|-id=174
| 10174 Emička || 1995 JD || Ema Moravcová (born 1999), is the daughter of the discoverer, Zdeněk Moravec. || 
|-id=175
| 10175 Aenona ||  || Aenona, now the Croatian city of Nin is the Roman name of the first capital of the old Croatian kingdom. It is located on the east coast of the Adriatic Sea. The world's smallest cathedral, used as an observatory for establishing the local calendar, is located there. || 
|-id=176
| 10176 Gaiavettori ||  || Gaia Vettori (born 1999) is the daughter of Vincenzo Vettori, an amateur astronomer in the Montelupo Group || 
|-id=177
| 10177 Ellison ||  || Harlan Ellison (1934–2018) was an American science-fiction author. || 
|-id=178
| 10178 Iriki || 1996 DD || Iriki, a historical town in the Satsuma area, Kagoshima prefecture, Japan (now merged into Satsumasendai, Kagoshima) Here on the Mt. Yaeyama highland are the National Astronomical Observatory's Iriki Station of VERA (VLBI Exploration of Radio Astrometry), as well as the Kagoshima University's 1-m optical-infrared telescope. || 
|-id=179
| 10179 Ishigaki || 1996 DE || The picturesque Ishigakijima is the largest of the Yaeyama Islands, Okinawa prefecture. Installed in this island is the National Astronomical Observatory's Ishigaki Station of VERA (VLBI Exploration of Radio Astrometry) || 
|-id=181
| 10181 Davidacomba ||  || Davida H. Comba (born 1928), wife of American amateur astronomer Paul G. Comba, who discovered this minor planet. || 
|-id=182
| 10182 Junkobiwaki ||  || Junko Biwaki (born 1914) was a teacher of elementary and junior high-school in Yamaguchi prefecture for 43 years beginning in 1933. || 
|-id=183
| 10183 Ampère ||  || André-Marie Ampère (1775–1836), French physicist who founded the science of electromagnetism. In 1820 he formulated a law that mathematically describes the phenomenon of deflection of a magnetic needle near a current-carrying wire. A full account of his theories has been given in his Mémoire sur la théorie mathématique des phénomènes électrodynamique (1827). || 
|-id=184
| 10184 Galvani ||  || Luigi Galvani (1737–1798), Italian physician and physicist who conceived the electrical nature of nerve impulses. His discoveries led to the invention of the voltaic pile. His findings have been published in De viribus electricitatis in motu musculari commentarius (1791). || 
|-id=185
| 10185 Gaudi ||  || Antoni Gaudí (1852–1926), a Spanish architect || 
|-id=186
| 10186 Albéniz ||  || Spanish composer and pianist Isaac Albéniz (1860–1909)  || 
|-id=188
| 10188 Yasuoyoneda || 1996 JY || Yasuo Yoneda (born 1942), the first director of "Tenkyukan", the Dynic Astronomical Observatory, is an amateur astronomer who observes sunspots. He contributes to the spread of astronomy and to the support of amateur astronomers.  || 
|-id=189
| 10189 Normanrockwell ||  || Norman Rockwell (1894–1978)  || 
|-id=193
| 10193 Nishimoto ||  || Physicist Daron L. Nishimoto (born 1966) has worked at AMOS since 1988. || 
|-id=195
| 10195 Nebraska ||  || The U.S. state of Nebraska. This minor planet has been the first one to be discovered in this state. || 
|-id=197
| 10197 Senigalliesi || 1996 UO ||Italian amateur astronomer Paolo Senigalliesi (1936–1986)|| 
|-id=198
| 10198 Pinelli ||  || Paolo Pinelli (born 1954) is an amateur astronomer of the Montelupo group. He was the first to propose the construction of a public observatory in the city of Montelupo || 
|-id=199
| 10199 Chariklo ||  || Chariclo (Chariklo), from Greek mythology, a female centaur and the wife of Chiron, sometimes described as a sea nymph. Together they are said to have had as many as five children, and she is also sometimes said to have been the mother of Tiresias, the famous seer. || 
|-id=200
| 10200 Quadri ||  || Ulisse Quadri (born 1953), an Italian teacher, amateur astronomer, discoverer of minor planets and author of articles and texts on science and mathematics for children. || 
|}

10201–10300 

|-
| 10201 Korado ||  || Korado Korlević (born 1958), a Croatian astronomer || 
|-id=203
| 10203 Flinders || 1997 PQ || Matthew Flinders (1774–1814), British navigator and explorer, or his grandson the archaeologist and Egyptologist Flinders Petrie || 
|-id=204
| 10204 Turing ||  || Alan Turing (1912–1954), British mathematician, logician, cryptographer, and computer scientist || 
|-id=205
| 10205 Pokorný ||  || Zdeněk Pokorný (born 1947), a Czech astronomer || 
|-id=207
| 10207 Comeniana || 1997 QA || Bratislava's Comenius University (Universitas Comeniana in Latin)|| 
|-id=208
| 10208 Germanicus ||  || Germanicus (15 B.C.–19 A.D.) || 
|-id=209
| 10209 Izanaki ||  || Izanagi, from Japanese mythology, is the god who descended to the island Onogoro with the goddess Izanami and created the land there, including the island of Awaji. || 
|-id=210
| 10210 Nathues ||  || Andreas Nathues (born 1967), a German geophysicist who studied the physical properties of the Eunomia family of minor planets at the German Aerospace Center (DLR), Berlin || 
|-id=211
| 10211 La Spezia ||  || La Spezia is an Italian town near the Monte Viseggi Observatory. || 
|-id=213
| 10213 Koukolík ||  || František Koukolík (born 1941), Czech neuropathologist and popularizer of science || 
|-id=215
| 10215 Lavilledemirmont || 1997 SQ || Jean de la Ville de Mirmont (1864–1914) a French writer || 
|-id=216
| 10216 Popastro ||  || Society for Popular Astronomy (SPA), a national astronomical society based in the United Kingdom, celebrates its fiftieth anniversary in 2003. It was established as the Junior Astronomical Society to promote astronomy as a hobby, particularly among beginners. The SPA is one of three national societies for astronomy in the U.K || 
|-id=217
| 10217 Richardcook ||  || Richard Cook (born 1965) was the Mars Pathfinder Flight Operations Manager and was responsible for running the day-to-day operations of the Mars Pathfinder spacecraft during launch, the landing phase and surface operations on Mars || 
|-id=218
| 10218 Bierstadt ||  || Albert Bierstadt (1830–1902) || 
|-id=219
| 10219 Penco ||  || Umberto Penco, an Italian physicist at the University of Pisa.|| 
|-id=220
| 10220 Pigott ||  || Edward Pigott (1753–1825), an English astronomer and discoverer of variable stars and comets || 
|-id=221
| 10221 Kubrick ||  || Stanley Kubrick (1928–1999), American film director || 
|-id=222
| 10222 Klotz ||  || Alain Klotz (born 1947), a French amateur astronomer at the Centres d´Etudes Spatiales du Rayonnement in Toulouse. He is currently president of AUDE, the French electronic detectors users association. || 
|-id=223
| 10223 Zashikiwarashi ||  || Taking the form of a child with bobbed hair, Zashikiwarashi is a traditional spirit of the people of the Tohoku district. It haunts the Japanese-style rooms of old families. It is said that a family would be wealthy while the spirit lives and become poor when it leaves || 
|-id=224
| 10224 Hisashi ||  || Hisashi Hirabayashi (born 1943), Japanese senior chief officer of JAXA Space Education and director of the Space Education Center, who led the Very Long Baseline Interferometer and Space Observatory Program with the radio satellite HALCA that successfully revealed active galactic nuclei. || 
|-id=226
| 10226 Seishika ||  || Seishika is a thin purple flower specified as an endangered plant. It lives only in the Yaeyama Islands area, Okinawa prefecture. The flower blooms around April on Mt. Banna-take near the VERA Ishigakijima Station || 
|-id=227
| 10227 Izanami ||  || Izanami-no-mikoto is the mythical goddess who descended to the island Onogoro with the god Izanaki and various other gods. After her death she was also called Yomotsu-ookami in the land of the dead || 
|-id=233
| 10233 Le Creusot ||  || The French town of Le Creusot, location of the Le Creusot Observatory and home of the discoverer Jean-Claude Merlin || 
|-id=234
| 10234 Sixtygarden ||  || 60 Garden Street is the street address of the Harvard-Smithsonian Center for Astrophysics.  || 
|-id=237
| 10237 Adzic ||  || Vladislav Adzic (born 1984), 2002 Intel ISEF finalist. He attended the Ward Melville High School, East Setauket, New York, U.S.A || 
|-id=239
| 10239 Hermann ||  || Shawn M. Hermann (born 1975), now at Raytheon Corporation, Tucson, was one of the first observers for LONEOS. During 1998–1999 he discovered two Apollos, an Amor and a comet, 275P/Hermann. || 
|-id=241
| 10241 Miličević ||  || Nikola Miličević (1887–1963), Croatian astronomer and last administrator of Blaca hermitage (or Pustinja Blaca – Blaca monastery) on Brač, Croatia || 
|-id=242
| 10242 Wasserkuppe || 2808 P-L || Wasserkuppe, high plateau, the highest peak in the Rhön Mountains, in the German state of Hesse. At 950 m, is the highest peak in the Rhön. The area is used for glider training. || 
|-id=243
| 10243 Hohe Meissner || 3553 P-L || Hohe Meissner, (750 m) is a volcano north of the Rhön between the Werra and Fulda rivers, southeast of the city of Kassel, Germany. The basalt quarry is still used. The two rivers Werra and Fulda flow together near the city of Münden and form the Weser river. || 
|-id=244
| 10244 Thüringer Wald || 4668 P-L || Thüringer Wald, a German mountain range east of the Werra river, flowing from northwest to southeast. The summits are the Inselsberg (900 m) and the Beerberg (980 m). || 
|-id=245
| 10245 Inselsberg || 6071 P-L || Großer Inselsberg at 900 m, is one of the peaks of the Thüringer Wald mountain range, Germany. || 
|-id=246
| 10246 Frankenwald || 6381 P-L || The Franconian Forest (Germany, forms the continuation of the Thüringer Wald mountains to the southeast up to the Fichtelgebirge. || 
|-id=247
| 10247 Amphiaraos || 6629 P-L || Amphiaraus (Amphiaraos), from Greek mythology. The Greek seer took part in the campaign of the Argonauts and the "Seven against Thebes". || 
|-id=248
| 10248 Fichtelgebirge || 7639 P-L || Fichtelgebirge, is a compact German mountain range east of the city of Bayreuth. The highest mountain is the Schneeberg (1050 m). It is a popular skiing area. || 
|-id=249
| 10249 Harz || 9515 P-L || The Harz, is the northernmost and highest medium-high compact mountain range of Germany. The silver mines were used until the twentieth century, and other ores have been found here. || 
|-id=250
| 10250 Hellahaasse || 1252 T-1 || Hella S. Haasse, Dutch novelist || 
|-id=251
| 10251 Mulisch || 3089 T-1 || Harry Mulisch, Dutch writer || 
|-id=252
| 10252 Heidigraf || 4164 T-1 || Heidi Graf (born 1941), former Head of ESTEC Communications Office (1977–2006) at ESA; "founding mother" of permanent exhibition Space Expo in Noordwijk, Netherlands (since 1990) || 
|-id=253
| 10253 Westerwald || 2116 T-2 || Westerwald, in Germany. It is a low mountain range with some volcanoes, blending into the "Siebengebirge", a range of seven extinct volcanic mountains. || 
|-id=254
| 10254 Hunsrück || 2314 T-2 || The Hunsrück is a German mountain range, located west of the Rhine between the rivers Nahe and Mosel. In the southern part many semiprecious stones are found, helping create a jewelry industry. || 
|-id=255
| 10255 Taunus || 3398 T-3 || The Taunus, a German mountain range, is the continuation of the Hundsrück at the eastern side of the Rhine. Its highest mountain, at 880 m, is called "Feldberg in the Taunus". As in the Schwarzwald, there are many thermal springs. || 
|-id=256
| 10256 Vredevoogd || 4157 T-3 || Loek Vredevoogd, chairman of the Board of Governors of Leiden University during 1994–2002. || 
|-id=257
| 10257 Garecynthia || 4333 T-3 || The marriage of Gareth Williams, associate director of the Minor Planet Center, and Cynthia Marsden, daughter of the director, Brian G. Marsden, in Lexington, Massachusetts, on 1 October 2002. || 
|-id=258
| 10258 Sárneczky || 1940 AB || Krisztián Sárneczky (born 1974) is a Hungarian asteroid and comet researcher at Konkoly Observatory, who discovered 363 numbered asteroids and five supernovae. He is the leader of the Comet Section of the Hungarian Astronomical Association. || 
|-id=259
| 10259 Osipovyurij || 1972 HL || Yury Osipov (born 1936) is a Russian mathematician and mechanician. Since 1991 he has been president of the Russian Academy of Sciences || 
|-id=261
| 10261 Nikdollezhalʹ ||  || Nikolay Dollezhal (1899–2000), Russian expert in power engineering, was the chief designer of the reactor for the world's first atomic power station, located in Obninsk, some 120 km southwest of Moscow || 
|-id=262
| 10262 Samoilov ||  || Evgenij Valerianovich Samoilov (born 1912) is a Russian dramatic actor and People's Artist of the former U.S.S.R. He performs at the State Academic Maly Theatre in Moscow || 
|-id=263
| 10263 Vadimsimona ||  || Russian physicist Vadim Aleksandrovich Simonenko is deputy director of the Russian Scientific Research Institute of Technical Physics at Snezhinsk. He is known for his work on the hazards of near-earth objects and the protection of the earth || 
|-id=264
| 10264 Marov ||  || Mikhail Yakovlevich Marov (born 1933), professor and head of the planetary department at Keldysh Institute of Applied Mathematics. He is also currently the president of IAU Division III. || 
|-id=265
| 10265 Gunnarsson ||  || Marcus Gunnarsson (born 1971), a planetary scientist at Uppsala Astronomical Observatory || 
|-id=266
| 10266 Vladishukhov ||  || Vladimir Shukhov (1853–1939), Russian engineer and inventor of the water-tube boiler || 
|-id=267
| 10267 Giuppone ||  || Cristian Giuppone (born 1979) is an Argentine astronomer at the Cordoba Astronomical Observatory investigating the co-orbital three-body problem with dissipation, with applications to planetary and small bodies dynamics. || 
|-id=269
| 10269 Tusi ||  || Nasīr al-Dīn al-Tūsī † || 
|-id=270
| 10270 Skoglöv ||  || Erik Skoglöv (born 1968), a Swedish astronomer at Uppsala Observatory || 
|-id=272
| 10272 Yuko ||  || Yuko Kimura (born 1981) is an administrative associate at the National Astronomical Observatory of Japan who organizes international collaboration programs promoting studies of asteroids. || 
|-id=273
| 10273 Katvolk ||  || Kathryn Volk (born 1985) completed her PhD at the University of Arizona investigating the long-term dynamical evolution of Centaur asteroids and the Kuiper Belt. || 
|-id=274
| 10274 Larryevans ||  || Larry Evans (born 1943) is an expert in gamma-ray, x-ray and neutron spectroscopy, including the analysis and interpretation of data collected by the NEAR mission to (433) Eros. || 
|-id=275
| 10275 Nathankaib ||  || Nathan Kaib (born 1980) is a professor at the University of Oklahoma who specializes in the formation and evolution of planetary systems, in particular the outer solar system. || 
|-id=276
| 10276 Matney ||  || Mark Matney (born 1963) || 
|-id=277
| 10277 Micheli ||  || Marco Micheli (born 1983), an Italian discoverer of minor planets, researcher at ESA's SSA programme NEO Coordination Centre and a member of the Pan-STARRS1 survey's NEO search team studying meteor streams || 
|-id=278
| 10278 Virkki ||  || Anne Virkki (born 1988) is a postdoctoral scholar at the Arecibo Observatory who studies near-Earth asteroids, specializing in understanding the properties of asteroid surfaces and regolith using radar scattering measurements. || 
|-id=279
| 10279 Rhiannonblaauw ||  || Rhiannon Blaauw (born 1986) is a scientist working at the NASA Meteoroid Environment Office. || 
|-id=280
| 10280 Yequanzhi ||  || Ye Quan-Zhi (born 1988), a Chinese postdoctoral researcher at Caltech and discoverer of minor planets, who studies the transitions between asteroids and comets and associated meteor streams. || 
|-id=281
| 10281 Libourel ||  || Guy Libourel (born 1956) is a cosmochemist at Observatoire de la Côte d´Azur (France) whose research includes the petrology and formation of chondrules. || 
|-id=282
| 10282 Emilykramer ||  || Emily Kramer (born 1986) is a postdoctoral researcher at the Jet Propulsion Laboratory who uses visible and thermal wavelength measurements to estimate the amount of mass shed by comets throughout their orbits. || 
|-id=283
| 10283 Cromer ||  || Teachers Michael (born 1941) and Sarah (born 1945) Cromer, of Flagstaff, Arizona || 
|-id=285
| 10285 Renémichelsen ||  || René Michelsen, a Danish astronomer and discoverer of minor planets || 
|-id=286
| 10286 Shnollia ||  || Simon Shnoll, Russian biophysicist || 
|-id=287
| 10287 Smale ||  || American mathematician Stephen Smale (born 1930) is a member of the National Academy of Sciences. || 
|-id=288
| 10288 Saville || 1983 WN || Curt Saville (1946–2001) was an avid ocean and arctic explorer. He rowed across both the Atlantic and Pacific oceans. Saville also worked to encourage scientific exploration of the Earth and space. The name was suggested by P. C. Thomas || 
|-id=289
| 10289 Geoffperry || 1984 QS || Geoffrey Perry (1927–2000), a physics teacher at Kettering Grammar School, England, taught his students to monitor radio signals from Soviet satellites. His group of students discovered the Plesetsk launch site and became the most reliable public source of space information during the Cold War. || 
|-id=290
| 10290 Kettering || 1985 SR || Kettering Group, the satellite tracking group established by Geoffrey Perry at the school at which he taught. The group monitored and analyzed radio transmissions from Soviet satellites, often scooping official news media. || 
|-id=293
| 10293 Pribina ||  || Pribina (c. 800–861), a Slavic prince and first Slavic ruler to build a Christian church on Slavic territory in Nitra || 
|-id=295
| 10295 Hippolyta || 1988 GB || Hippolyta, from Greek mythology, was one of the greatest queens of the Amazons. She wore a beautiful golden girdle, a gift from her father Ares, the war-god, as a symbol of her Amazonian queenship. Heracles was sent by the Greeks to acquire the girdle, a battle took place, and beautiful Hippolyta died. || 
|-id=296
| 10296 Rominadisisto ||  || Romina Paula Di Sisto (born 1970) is an astronomer at the La Plata University of Argentina whose research includes the dynamics and collisional evolution of Centaurs, Jupiter family comets, and Hilda and Trojan asteroids. || 
|-id=297
| 10297 Lynnejones ||  || Rhiannon Lynne Allen (R. Lynne Jones) (born 1973) is a researcher at the University of Washington working to optimize the performance of the Large Synoptic Survey Telescope for solar system science. || 
|-id=298
| 10298 Jiangchuanhuang ||  || Jiangchuan Huang (born 1961) served as the chief designer of the Chang'e 2 satellite, which in 2008 executed a fly-by of (4179) Toutatis. || 
|-id=300
| 10300 Tanakadate ||  || Tanakadate Aikitsu (1856–1952), a Japanese geophysicist and founder of the International Latitude Observatory at Mizusawa, Iwate || 
|}

10301–10400 

|-
| 10301 Kataoka || 1989 FH || Yoshiko Kataoka (born 1927), an amateur astronomer in Takarazuka, Hyogo prefecture, is a director of the Oriental Astronomical Association.  || 
|-id=303
| 10303 Fréret ||  || French historian Nicolas Fréret (1688–1749) || 
|-id=304
| 10304 Iwaki || 1989 SY || Masae Iwaki (born 1933), an amateur astronomer in Oita, is the winner of the Vega Prize for distinguished women amateur astronomers.  || 
|-id=305
| 10305 Grignard ||  || Fernand (Ferre) Grignard (1939–1982)|| 
|-id=306
| 10306 Pagnol || 1990 QY || Marcel Pagnol (1895–1974) was a French writer. || 
|-id=310
| 10310 Delacroix ||  || Eugène Delacroix (1798–1863), a French painter. || 
|-id=311
| 10311 Fantin-Latour ||  || Henri Fantin-Latour (1836–1904), a French painter, was known for his still-life paintings with flowers and later for his lithographs. || 
|-id=313
| 10313 Vanessa-Mae ||  || Vanessa-Mae (born 1978), a Singaporean-British violinist, created a "bridge between classical and popular music". Her debut album in 1995 sold two million copies. || 
|-id=315
| 10315 Brewster ||  || Stephen Singer-Brewster (born 1945), a former member of the Palomar Planet Crossing Asteroid Survey, has had a long fascination with astronomy. He is a member of the Outer Planets project at the Jet Propulsion Laboratory and a member of the board of trustees of Stony Ridge Observatory. He discovered comet 105P. || 
|-id=316
| 10316 Williamturner ||  || William Turner (1508–1568), British ornithologist and "Father of English Botany", is best known for his book A New Herball. || 
|-id=318
| 10318 Sumaura || 1990 TX || Sumaura Elementary School, established in 1902, is the oldest private elementary school in Kobe. || 
|-id=319
| 10319 Toshiharu ||  || Toshiharu Hatanaka (born 1962), a research associate in the department of information and knowledge engineering at Tottori University, is president of the Tottori Society of Astronomy || 
|-id=320
| 10320 Reiland ||  || Charles Thomas Reiland (born 1946), for many years president of the Amateur Astronomers Association of Pittsburgh, initiated the Wagman Observatory, observed in the Allegheny Observatory's astrometry program and promoted public interest in astronomy. || 
|-id=321
| 10321 Rampo ||  || Rampo Edogawa (Hirai Taro, 1894–1965), born in Nabari city, Mie prefecture, was a writer who specialized in Japan's mystery genre. He was popular with young readers, and one of his best-known novels is The Boy Detectives Club. || 
|-id=322
| 10322 Mayuminarita ||  || Mayumi Narita (born 1970) is a Japanese swimmer who is a paraplegic. At the Paralympic Games in Sydney in 2000, she won six gold medals and one silver medal. She also won two gold, two silver and one bronze in Atlanta in 1996 || 
|-id=323
| 10323 Frazer ||  || James George Frazer (1854–1941) is best remembered for The Golden Bough, a study in comparative religion (in 12 volumes). || 
|-id=324
| 10324 Vladimirov ||  || Vladimir Alekseevich Vladimirov (born 1951) is an authority on stability theory in hydrodynamics and biophysical hydrodynamics. He is a professor of applied mathematics at the University of York. The name was suggested by V. J. Judovich || 
|-id=325
| 10325 Bexa ||  || The iceberg B10A, which measures some 80 km by 40 km, broke off from the Thwaites glacier in Antarctica in 1992. Having taken hundreds of thousands of years to form, B10A now drifts in the South Atlantic driven by marine currents and wind || 
|-id=326
| 10326 Kuragano ||  || Sukehikro Kuragano (born 1933) is a member of Kawasaki Astronomical Association and has been an amateur observer of variable stars for about half a century. He independently discovered Comet C/1957 P1 (Mrkos) while he was climbing Mt. Fuji || 
|-id=327
| 10327 Batens ||  || Diderik Batens (born 1944) is a member of the philosophy department at the University of Ghent.  || 
|-id=330
| 10330 Durkheim ||  || Émile Durkheim (1858–1917), a French sociologist, was convinced that ethical and social structures were endangered by the advent of technology and mechanization. || 
|-id=331
| 10331 Peterbluhm ||  || Peter Bluhm (1942–1997), a German Computer specialist, was known for his efforts in electronic communication among amateur astronomers in Germany since the early 1980s. In 1987 he founded the first Astronomical Bulletin Board System in Dahlenburg. The name was suggested by A. Doppler. || 
|-id=332
| 10332 Défi ||  || Défi Corporatif Canderel is a fundraising event for cancer research programs at universities in Montreal. Founded by Jonathan Wener, the event has been directed by Gerald Levy since its inception in 1990. It features a costumed run through the streets of Montreal and has raised more than three million dollars. || 
|-id=334
| 10334 Gibbon ||  || Edward Gibbon (1737–1794), a British historian. || 
|-id=340
| 10340 Jostjahn ||  || Jost Jahn (born 1959), German amateur astronomer and discoverer of minor planets || 
|-id=343
| 10343 Church ||  || Frederic Edwin Church (1826–1900), an American painter, one of several artists of the Hudson River School. || 
|-id=346
| 10346 Triathlon ||  || Since Pam Truty founded the Burn Lake Triathlon in Las Cruces, New Mexico, in 1984, the relay team of Wendee Wallach-Levy, Laura Wright and Barbara Pardo has won medals every year, including 14 golds. Laura has also done more than 30 years volunteer work for the American Red Cross. || 
|-id=347
| 10347 Murom ||  || Murom, Russia, on the left bank of the Oka river || 
|-id=348
| 10348 Poelchau ||  || Harald Poelchau (1903–1972), a German theologian, socialist and humanist.|| 
|-id=350
| 10350 Spallanzani ||  || Lazzaro Spallanzani (1729–1799), an Italian biologist, was known for his research on the spontaneous generation of cellular life. He also proved that microbes come from the air, paving the way for Pasteur. || 
|-id=351
| 10351 Seiichisato ||  || Seiichi Sato (born 1930) is a member of Kawasaki Astronomical Association. || 
|-id=352
| 10352 Kawamura ||  || Mikio Kawamura (born 1931) is a member of Kawasaki Astronomical Association. He is a mechanical engineer by profession and has published five books on telescope-making. || 
|-id=353
| 10353 Momotaro ||  || In a Japanese folk tale Momotaro, the Peach Boy, came out of a big peach and fought off ogres with his partners---a dog, a monkey and a pheasant || 
|-id=354
| 10354 Guillaumebudé ||  || Guillaume Budé (1468–1540) was one of the first philologists in France to teach himself classical Greek. || 
|-id=355
| 10355 Kojiroharada || 1993 EQ || Kojiro Harada (born 1926), mechanical engineer, is a member of Kawasaki Astronomical Association. || 
|-id=356
| 10356 Rudolfsteiner ||  || Rudolf Steiner (1861–1925), Austrian thinker, who was the editor of the scientific works of Wolfgang Goethe. || 
|-id=358
| 10358 Kirchhoff ||  || Gustav Kirchhoff (1824–1887) was a German physicist who, together with Robert Bunsen, founded the discipline of spectrum analysis. They demonstrated that an element gives off a characteristic colored light when heated to incandescence. || 
|-id=361
| 10361 Bunsen ||  || Robert Bunsen (1811–1899) was a German chemist who discovered the alkali-group metals cesium and rubidium. He also found an antidote to arsenic poisoning (1834) and invented the carbon-zinc electric cell (1841). He is also remembered for the development of the Bunsen burner. || 
|-id=364
| 10364 Tainai ||  || Tainai-Daira is a hilly district in Kurokawa Village, north of Niigata prefecture. Since 1984, the village has become the venue of the "Tainai Hoshi Matsuri". || 
|-id=365
| 10365 Kurokawa ||  || Kurokawa is a small village with a mere 1800 population, located in northern Niigata prefecture.  || 
|-id=366
| 10366 Shozosato ||  || Shozo Sato (born 1943) is a maker and repairman of art clocks. He is an experienced lunar photographer.  || 
|-id=367
| 10367 Sayo ||  || Sayo is a town in Hyogo prefecture where the Nishi-Harima Astronomical Observatory is situated. The town was declared the Town of Stars in 1990 || 
|-id=368
| 10368 Kozuki ||  || Kozuki is a town in Hyogo prefecture where the Nishi-Harima Astronomical Observatory is situated. The emblem of Kozuki Town is the waning moon || 
|-id=369
| 10369 Sinden ||  || David Sinden (born 1932), as chief optician for Grubb-Parsons of Newcastle upon Tyne, was responsible for the optical components of the Isaac Newton, Anglo-Australian and U.K. Schmidt telescopes. In 1979, he founded the Sinden Optical Company, which in 2003 restored Thomas Grubb's first reflector (1834) || 
|-id=370
| 10370 Hylonome ||  || In Greek myth, Hylonome was in love with Cyllaros, who was accidentally killed by a javelin thrown at a wedding. On witnessing this, Hylonome threw herself on the javelin and died. || 
|-id=371
| 10371 Gigli ||  || Paolo Gigli, Italian astronomer and co-founder of the Pian dei Termini Observatory. Early on, Gigli's main interests concerned the study of variable stars and the observation of the Sun. Later he became a speaker on astronomy at the observatory. || 
|-id=372
| 10372 Moran ||  || Landscape artist Thomas Moran (1837–1926) focused his work on the American frontier, from the shores of Lake Superior to the "Grand Canyon of the Yellowstone". His illustrations of the west appeared in Harper's Weekly and The Aldine, among others. He participated in John Wesley Powell's 1873 expedition to the Grand Canyon || 
|-id=373
| 10373 MacRobert || 1996 ER || Alan MacRobert (born 1951) || 
|-id=374
| 10374 Etampes ||  || Étampes, France || 
|-id=375
| 10375 Michiokuga ||  || Michio Kuga (1927–1999), high school teacher and from 1971 to 1982 curator at the Yamaguchi Museum.  || 
|-id=376
| 10376 Chiarini || 1996 KW || Francesca (born 1981) and Gabriele (born 1986) Chiarini are grandchildren of Giorgio Sassi, co-founder of Osservatorio San Vittore. || 
|-id=377
| 10377 Kilimanjaro ||  || Kilimanjaro, a dormant volcano and the highest mountain in Africa || 
|-id=378
| 10378 Ingmarbergman ||  || Ingmar Bergman (1918–2007), a Swedish theatre and film director who has achieved fame with films such as The Seventh Seal (1956) and Wild Strawberries (1957).  || 
|-id=379
| 10379 Lake Placid || 1996 OH || Lake Placid is a town in northern New York State in the U.S. that hosted the 1932 and 1980 Olympic Winter Games, Lake Placid is also the birthplace of the discoverer. || 
|-id=380
| 10380 Berwald ||  || Franz Berwald (1796–1868), a Swedish composer. || 
|-id=381
| 10381 Malinsmith || 1996 RB || Konrad Malin-Smith (born 1934), a retired science teacher. || 
|-id=382
| 10382 Hadamard ||  || Jacques Hadamard (1865–1963), French mathematician, who made major contributions to the theory of functions of a complex variable and the study of the partial differential equations of mathematical physics. In 1896 he gave a proof of the prime number theorem that defines the frequency of prime numbers among the integers (also see Hadamard transform). || 
|-id=385
| 10385 Amaterasu ||  || Amaterasu-oomikami, the mythical Japanese goddess of the sun, was born from the left eye of the god Izanaki and ruled the world of the heaven Takamagahara. To protest the misconduct of her younger brother, the god Susanoo, she hid in the cave called Ama-no-iwayado, and the world fell into complete darkness || 
|-id=386
| 10386 Romulus ||  || Romulus, first king of Rome, reigned from 753 to 716 BC. Legend has it that the twins Romulus and Remus were saved from the Tiber river by the wolf that raised them. In the first year of this reign Romulus founded the city. He was deified as Quirinus. || 
|-id=387
| 10387 Bepicolombo || 1996 UQ || Giuseppe (Bepi) Colombo (1920–1984), an Italian mathematician and astronomer at the University of Padova. || 
|-id=388
| 10388 Zhuguangya ||  || Chinese nuclear scientist Zhu Guangya (born 1924) made many contributions to nuclear physics and atomic energy technologies and helped develop China's atomic energy program || 
|-id=389
| 10389 Robmanning || 1997 LD || Rob Manning (born 1958) was the Flight System Chief Engineer for the successful Mars Pathfinder mission at JPL. He was responsible for all technical aspects of the Pathfinder spacecraft. He also led the team that designed, developed, tested and operated Pathfinder's entry, descent and landing system || 
|-id=390
| 10390 Lenka ||  || Lenka Šarounová (born 1973). || 
|-id=392
| 10392 Brace ||  || DeWitt Bristol Brace (1858–1905), who founded the department of physics and astronomy at the University of Nebraska in 1888.  || 
|-id=395
| 10395 Jirkahorn ||  || Jiří Horn (1941–1994), an astronomer at the Ondřejov Observatory. He worked in stellar astrophysics, observational astronomy and data reduction. || 
|-id=399
| 10399 Nishiharima ||  || Nishiharima is the southwestern area of Hyogo prefecture and site of the Nishi-Harima Astronomical Observatory || 
|-id=400
| 10400 Hakkaisan || 1997 VX || Hakkaisan is a sacred mountain in Niigata prefecture, where religious training is carried out. The astronomical observatory of Nihon University has been located on the hillside since 1992 || 
|}

10401–10500 

|-
| 10401 Masakoba ||  || Masateru Kobayashi (born 1953) is a Japanese amateur astronomer and the chairperson of the Astronomical Society of Yamaguchi prefecture. He has served as a guide at numerous stargazing meetings, and has planned and conducted many total solar eclipse tours. || 
|-id=403
| 10403 Marcelgrün ||  || Marcel Grün (born 1946), Czech astronomer and director of the Prague Planetarium || 
|-id=404
| 10404 McCall ||  || Robert T. McCall (1919–2010). His works include murals at the National Air and Space Museum and illustrations for 2001: A Space Odyssey. || 
|-id=405
| 10405 Yoshiaki ||  || Yoshiaki Mogami (1546–1614), a military commander during the Japanese feudal period. || 
|-id=410
| 10410 Yangguanghua ||  || Yang Guanghua (1923–2006) was a chemical engineer and an educationalist. || 
|-id=412
| 10412 Tsukuyomi ||  || Tsukuyomi-no-mikoto, the Japanese god of night and the moon, was born from the right eye of the god Izanami no kami (Izanaki). It is said that he made his older sister, the goddess Amaterasu, very angry and caused the separate appearance of the sun in the day and the moon at night. || 
|-id=413
| 10413 Pansecchi ||  || Luigi Pansecchi (born 1940). || 
|-id=415
| 10415 Mali Lošinj ||  || Mali Lošinj, Croatian island and city, known for its nautical school and the Leo Brenner Astronomical Society || 
|-id=416
| 10416 Kottler ||  || Herbert Kottler (born 1939), MIT Lincoln Laboratory associate director in 1984–1996. || 
|-id=421
| 10421 Dalmatin ||  || Herman Dalmatin (Hermanus Dalmata), 12th-century Croatian translator of astronomical and mathematical Arabic books || 
|-id=423
| 10423 Dajčić || 1999 BB || Mario Dajčić (1923–1991), Croatian amateur astronomer, telescope builder and educator, founder of the Astronomical Society of Pula || 
|-id=424
| 10424 Gaillard ||  || Boris Gaillard (born 1976) is an amateur astronomer and software engineer. || 
|-id=425
| 10425 Landfermann ||  || Dietrich Wilhelm Landfermann (1800–1882), a German educator. || 
|-id=426
| 10426 Charlierouse ||  || Charles (Charlie) Rouse (1924–1988), an American jazz tenor saxophonist. || 
|-id=427
| 10427 Klinkenberg || 2017 P-L || Dirk Klinkenberg, Dutch mathematician and astronomer, discoverer of several comets † || 
|-id=428
| 10428 Wanders || 2073 P-L || Adriaan Wanders (1903–1984), Dutch astronomer, author, and researcher of sunspots. || 
|-id=429
| 10429 van Woerden || 2546 P-L || Hugo van Woerden (born 1926), Dutch astronomer who studied neutral hydrogen in galaxies || 
|-id=430
| 10430 Martschmidt || 4030 P-L || Maarten Schmidt (1929–2022), Dutch-born American astronomer || 
|-id=431
| 10431 Pottasch || 4042 P-L || Stuart R. Pottasch (born 1932), American astrophysics professor and expert on planetary nebulae || 
|-id=432
| 10432 Ullischwarz || 4623 P-L || Ulrich Schwarz (born 1932), Dutch radio astronomer || 
|-id=433
| 10433 Ponsen || 4716 P-L || Jaap Ponsen (1931–1961), Dutch astronomer on variable stars, who observed at the Leiden Southern Station in South Africa || 
|-id=434
| 10434 Tinbergen || 4722 P-L || Jaap Tinbergen (born 1934), Dutch radio astronomer || 
|-id=435
| 10435 Tjeerd || 6064 P-L || Tjeerd van Albada (born 1936), Dutch astronomer || 
|-id=436
| 10436 Janwillempel || 6073 P-L || Jan Willem Pel (born 1943), Dutch astronomer and photometrist, project leader for a spectrograph on the VLT || 
|-id=437
| 10437 van der Kruit || 6085 P-L || Pieter van der Kruit (born 1944), Dutch radio astronomer || 
|-id=438
| 10438 Ludolph || 6615 P-L || Ludolph van Ceulen (1540–1610), Dutch mathematician who calculated the value of Pi to 35 decimal places || 
|-id=439
| 10439 van Schooten || 6676 P-L || Frans van Schooten (1615–1660), Dutch mathematician || 
|-id=440
| 10440 van Swinden || 7636 P-L || Jean Henri van Swinden (1746–1823), Dutch mathematician and physicist || 
|-id=441
| 10441 van Rijckevorsel || 9076 P-L || Elie van Rijckevorsel (1845–1928), who collaborated on the first geomagnetic survey in the Netherlands || 
|-id=442
| 10442 Biezenzo || 4062 T-1 || Cornelis Biezenzo (1888–1975), Dutch physicist || 
|-id=443
| 10443 van der Pol || 1045 T-2 || Balthasar van der Pol, Dutch experimental physicist † || 
|-id=444
| 10444 de Hevesy || 3290 T-2 || George de Hevesy, Hungarian chemist † || 
|-id=445
| 10445 Coster || 4090 T-2 || Dirk Coster, Dutch chemist and co-discoverer of the element Hafnium † || 
|-id=446
| 10446 Siegbahn || 3006 T-3 || Kai Siegbahn, Swedish physicist, winner of the 1981 Nobel Prize in physics. || 
|-id=447
| 10447 Bloembergen || 3357 T-3 || Nicolaas Bloembergen, Dutch physicist, winner of the 1981 Nobel Prize in physics † || 
|-id=448
| 10448 Schawlow || 4314 T-3 || Arthur Leonard Schawlow, American physicist, winner of the 1981 Nobel Prize in Physics. || 
|-id=449
| 10449 Takuma || 1936 UD || Hitoshi Takuma (born 1949), an active solar observer in Japan. || 
|-id=450
| 10450 Girard || 1967 JQ || Terrence Girard (born 1957), American astronomer || 
|-id=452
| 10452 Zuev ||  || Vladimir Evseevich Zuev (born 1925), a professor at Tomsk University, is a scientist in the field of atmospheric physics. || 
|-id=453
| 10453 Banzan ||  || Kumazawa Banzan (1619–1691), a Confucian scholar in the Edo period. || 
|-id=454
| 10454 Vallenar || 1978 NY || Vallenar, capital of the Chilean province of Huasco, is located some 90 km north of the La Silla observatory site. || 
|-id=455
| 10455 Donnison ||  || John Donnison (born 1948), British astronomer || 
|-id=456
| 10456 Anechka ||  || Anya (Anechka) Ivanchenko (1987–1999), daughter of a friend of the discoverer Nikolai Chernykh || 
|-id=457
| 10457 Suminov ||  || Vyacheslav Mikhailovich Suminov (born 1932), a professor and head of the faculty at the Moscow Aviation-Technological Institute. || 
|-id=458
| 10458 Sfranke ||  || Sigbrit Franke (born 1942), Swedish educator || 
|-id=459
| 10459 Vladichaika ||  || Vladimir Dmitrievich Chaika, Ukrainian naval architect || 
|-id=460
| 10460 Correa-Otto ||  || Jorge Correa-Otto (born 1981) is an Argentine astronomer at San Juan National University. || 
|-id=461
| 10461 Dawilliams || 1978 XU || David Allen Williams (born 1966), an associate research professor in Earth & Space Exploration at Arizona State University || 
|-id=462
| 10462 Saxogrammaticus || 1979 KM || Saxo Grammaticus (c.1150–1220) was secretary to Bishop Absalon, the founder of Copenhagen. He is the author of the comprehensive Gesta Danorum (Deeds of the Danes). || 
|-id=463
| 10463 Bannister ||  || Michele Bannister (born 1986) is a postdoctoral research fellow at Queen's University Belfast whose work includes surveys to discover and characterize trans-Neptunian objects. || 
|-id=464
| 10464 Jessie || 1979 SC || Jessica Lynne Peterson, from Harvard MA, (1994–2009). || 
|-id=465
| 10465 Olkin ||  || Catherine B. Olkin (born 1966) is a researcher at Southwest Research Institute (Boulder, Colorado), Deputy Project Scientist for the New Horizons mission and Deputy Principal Investigator for the Lucy mission. Her studies include stellar occultations, color compositional analysis of the Pluto system, and the study of Trojans. || 
|-id=466
| 10466 Marius-Ioan ||  || Marius-Ioan Piso (born 1954) is President of the Romanian Space Agency (ROSA) and a leading advocate for space research in Romania. || 
|-id=467
| 10467 Peterbus ||  || Peter Bus (1951–2016) was a Dutch amateur astronomer and founding member of the Dutch Comet Section of the Royal Dutch Association for Meteorology and Astronomy. || 
|-id=468
| 10468 Itacuruba ||  || Itacuruba (Nova Itacuruba), a town in Pernambuco, Brazil, and location of the Observatório Astronômico do Sertão de Itaparica (OASI). The original city was flooded in 1988 in forming Itaparica Lake. || 
|-id=469
| 10469 Krohn ||  || Katrin Krohn (born 1984) is a researcher at the German Aerospace Center (DLR-Berlin) studying cryogenic flow features and cryovolcanism on Ceres using Dawn spacecraft data. || 
|-id=470
| 10470 Bartczak ||  || Przemysł aw Bartczak (born 1974) is a researcher at the Astronomical Observatory of the Adam Mickiewic University in Poznan, Poland who studies asteroid lightcurve inversion techniques that yield both convex and non-convex shape and spin solutions. || 
|-id=471
| 10471 Marciniak ||  || Anna Marciniak (born 1979) is a Polish researcher at the Poznań Observatory  of the Adam Mickiewicz University in Poznań, studying the spin and shape properties of long-period main-belt asteroids. || 
|-id=472
| 10472 Santana-Ros ||  || Toni Santana-Ros (born 1984) is a postdoctoral researcher at the Astronomical Observatory of the Adam Mickiewic University in Poznan, Poland where he performs photometric measurements of small bodies in support of the Gaia mission. || 
|-id=473
| 10473 Thirouin ||  || Audrey Thirouin (born 1984) is a researcher at the Lowell Observatory who performs photometric measurements of trans-Neptunian objects investigating differences in binary and non-binary populations. || 
|-id=474
| 10474 Pecina ||  || Petr Pecina (born 1950) is a retired astronomer from the Czech Academy of Sciences. || 
|-id=475
| 10475 Maxpoilâne ||  || Max Poilâne (born 1941) || 
|-id=476
| 10476 Los Molinos ||  || The Los Molinos Observatory located north of Montevideo, Uruguay. It is actively involved in follow-up observations of asteroids and comets. || 
|-id=477
| 10477 Lacumparsita ||  || The song La cumparsita || 
|-id=478
| 10478 Alsabti || 1981 WO || Abdul Athem Alsabti (born 1945)  || 
|-id=479
| 10479 Yiqunchen || 1982 HJ || Yiqun Chen (born 1968)  || 
|-id=480
| 10480 Jennyblue ||  || Jennifer S. Blue (born 1954), of the U.S. Geological Survey, Flagstaff, Arizona, has been the sine qua non of the IAU Working Group on Planetary System Nomenclature since 1995, serving both as its secretary and as the keeper of the Gazetteer of Planetary Nomenclature || 
|-id=481
| 10481 Esipov ||  || Valentin Feodorovich Esipov (born 1933), head of the radioastronomy department at the Sternberg Astronomical Institute, Moscow University. || 
|-id=482
| 10482 Dangrieser ||  || Daniel Grieser (1926–1999), an optical engineer with Battelle Memorial Institute in Columbus, Ohio. || 
|-id=483
| 10483 Tomburns ||  || Tom Burns (born 1952) || 
|-id=484
| 10484 Hecht || 1983 WM || Martin D. Hecht (born 1926) || 
|-id=487
| 10487 Danpeterson ||  || Dan Peterson (born 1949) || 
|-id=489
| 10489 Keinonen ||  || Juhani Keinonen (born 1946) || 
|-id=498
| 10498 Bobgent ||  || Robert Gent (born 1947). || 
|-id=500
| 10500 Nishi-koen || 1987 GA || Nishi-koen park is the location of the Sendai Astronomical Observatory. || 
|}

10501–10600 

|-
| 10501 Ardmacha || 1987 OT || The Irish Gaelic name of the city of Armagh in Northern Ireland † || 
|-id=502
| 10502 Armaghobs ||  || Armagh Observatory, Ireland † || 
|-id=503
| 10503 Johnmarks ||  || John D. Marks (born 1943), an American political writer, founder and former president of Search for Common Ground (SFCG), an international non-profit organization. || 
|-id=504
| 10504 Doga ||  || Eugenij Dmitrievich Doga (born 1937), a Russian composer. || 
|-id=505
| 10505 Johnnycash ||  || Johnny Cash (1932–2003), an American singer, songwriter, musician, and actor, nicknamed "The Man in Black" for his trademark all-black stage wardrobe. || 
|-id=506
| 10506 Rydberg ||  || Johannes Rydberg, 19th–20th-century Swedish physicist, after whom the Rydberg constant is named || 
|-id=509
| 10509 Heinrichkayser ||  || Heinrich Gustav Johannes Kayser, 19th–20th-century German physicist who demonstrated the presence of helium in the Earth's atmosphere || 
|-id=510
| 10510 Maxschreier ||  || Max Schreier (1907–1997), Austrian-born Bolivian astronomer, founder of observatories in Santa Ana and Patacamaya, and author of Einstein desde los Andes de Bolivia || 
|-id=512
| 10512 Yamandu ||  || Yamandu Alejandro Fernandez (1927–2010) || 
|-id=515
| 10515 Old Joe ||  || "Old Joe" is the students' name for the Joseph Chamberlain Clock Tower at the University of Birmingham. || 
|-id=516
| 10516 Sakurajima || 1989 VQ || Mount Sakurajima, a volcano on the southern tip of Kyūshū, Kagoshima prefecture, Japan. || 
|-id=523
| 10523 D'Haveloose ||  || José D´Haveloose (1922–1996), a surgeon in the West Flanders town of Tielt. || 
|-id=524
| 10524 Maniewski ||  || Jan Maniewski (born 1933), a medical doctor in Antwerp. || 
|-id=526
| 10526 Ginkogino ||  || Ginko Ogino (1851–1913) was a Japanese physician, who became the first registered woman doctor in Japan. || 
|-id=529
| 10529 Giessenburg ||  || Rudolf Charles d'Ablaing van Giessenburg (1826–1904), a Dutch writer, freemason and editor. || 
|-id=538
| 10538 Torode ||  || In a 1992 study of 170 astrolabes, British industrial chemist Rowland K. E. Torode (born 1923) measured the ecliptic longitudes of the stars depicted and thereby determined, with allowance for precession, the ages of the instruments. He was also secretary of the Kidderminster Astronomical Society for several years. || 
|-id=540
| 10540 Hachigoroh ||  || Hachigoroh Kikuchi (1926–1999) was the executive committee chief of the Haramura star party. || 
|-id=541
| 10541 Malesherbes || 1991 YX || Guillaume-Chrétien de Lamoignon de Malesherbes (1721–1794), a botanist and a French statesman. He was guillotined for his defense of King Louis XVI. || 
|-id=542
| 10542 Ruckers ||  || Hans Ruckers (1555–1623), a harpischord maker. || 
|-id=543
| 10543 Klee ||  || Paul Klee (1879–1940), a Swiss painter and graphic artist. || 
|-id=544
| 10544 Hörsnebara ||  || Hörsne and Bara Gotland parishes, Sweden, joined to become a single parish in 1883 || 
|-id=545
| 10545 Källunge ||  || Källunge is a small parish on Gotland. || 
|-id=546
| 10546 Nakanomakoto ||  || Makoto Nakano (born 1956), an associate professor in the Faculty of Education and Welfare Science at Oita University. || 
|-id=547
| 10547 Yosakoi || 1992 JF || Yosakoi, a popular Japanese folk song about the forbidden love between a monk and a girl || 
|-id=549
| 10549 Helsingborg ||  || Helsingborg, Sweden. || 
|-id=550
| 10550 Malmö ||  || Malmö, Sweden. || 
|-id=551
| 10551 Göteborg ||  || Gothenburg, Sweden. || 
|-id=552
| 10552 Stockholm ||  || Stockholm, Sweden. || 
|-id=553
| 10553 Stenkumla ||  || Stenkumla is a small parish on the island Gotland. || 
|-id=554
| 10554 Västerhejde ||  || Västerhejde socken on Gotland, Sweden. || 
|-id=555
| 10555 Tagaharue || 1993 HH || Harue Taga (born 1951), astronomy curator of Chiba Municipal Planetarium. || 
|-id=557
| 10557 Rowland ||  || Henry Augustus Rowland (1848–1901), American astronomer and first president of the American Physical Society. || 
|-id=558
| 10558 Karlstad ||  || Karlstad, Sweden. || 
|-id=559
| 10559 Yukihisa ||  || Yukihisa Matsumoto (born 1962), a former researcher of the Nishi Mino Observatory. || 
|-id=560
| 10560 Michinari || 1993 TN || Michinari Yamamoto (born 1970), a researcher at Ayabe City Observatory. || 
|-id=561
| 10561 Shimizumasahiro ||  || Masahiro Shimizu (born 1956), the president of the Shimizu Clinic. || 
|-id=563
| 10563 Izhdubar || 1993 WD || Izhdubar, an ancient Chaldean sun-god. || 
|-id=566
| 10566 Zabadak ||  || Zabadak is a name of a Japanese music group that is led by Tomohiko Kira.  || 
|-id=567
| 10567 Francobressan || 1994 CV || Franco Bressan (born 1947), an Italian mathematics teacher and amateur astronomer. || 
|-id=568
| 10568 Yoshitanaka ||  || Yoshiji Tanaka (1948–2003), a Japanese science magazine editor. || 
|-id=569
| 10569 Kinoshitamasao || 1994 GQ || [Masao Kinoshita (born 1949) discovered that the number of radio-meteor echoes decreases as the radiant approaches the meridian. This is widely known as the Kinoshita effect. || 
|-id=570
| 10570 Shibayasuo || 1994 GT || Yasuo Shiba (born 1961), a Japanese data manager of the Japan Meteor Society, specializing in fireballs || 
|-id=572
| 10572 Kominejo ||  || Kominejo castle, in Shirakawa city || 
|-id=573
| 10573 Piani ||  || Franco Piani (born 1955), Italian amateur astronomer.  || 
|-id=577
| 10577 Jihčesmuzeum || 1995 JC || Jihočeské muzeum (The South Bohemian Museum) was established in České Budějovice in 1877. || 
|-id=579
| 10579 Diluca || 1995 OE || Roberto Di Luca (born 1959), amateur observer of lunar and asteroidal occultations, is network manager at the Astronomical Observatory of the University of Bologna. As a member of the Associazione Astrofili Bolognesi, he often collaborates with the group at the Osservatorio San Vittore in Bologna. || 
|-id=581
| 10581 Jeníkhollan ||  || Jeník Hollan (born 1955), a Czech astronomer and environmentalist at the Brno Observatory. || 
|-id=582
| 10582 Harumi || 1995 TG || Harumi Ikari (born 1957), wife of Japanese astronomer Yasukazu Ikari, who discovered the minor planet. || 
|-id=583
| 10583 Kanetugu ||  || Kanetugu Naoe (1560–1619) was a Japanese military commander during the Japanese feudal period. || 
|-id=584
| 10584 Ferrini ||  || Federico Ferrini, Italian physicist and professor of astronomical techniques at the University of Pisa. He has published more than 100 scientific papers in major astronomical journals. These cover many subjects in modern theoretical astrophysics, among them planetology, star formation, the interstellar medium, galactic evolution and its cosmological effects. He is responsible for the Italian light pollution commission and is coordinator of the Mediterranean Astronomical Network. || 
|-id=585
| 10585 Wabi-Sabi ||  || Wabi-sabi is a Japanese aesthetic centered around imperfection. || 
|-id=586
| 10586 Jansteen ||  || Jan Havickszoon Steen (1626–1679) was a Dutch genre painter during the Dutch Golden Age. The name was suggested by W. Fröger. || 
|-id=587
| 10587 Strindberg ||  || August Strindberg (1849–1912), a Swedish playwright and novelist. His works include Röda Rummet ("The Red Room", 1879), Fröken Julie ("Miss Julie", 1888) and Dödsdansen ("The Dance of Death", 1900). || 
|-id=588
| 10588 Adamcrandall || 1996 OE || Adam Crandall Rees (born 1960), stepson of the discoverer, Paul G. Comba. || 
|-id=591
| 10591 Caverni ||  || Raffaello Caverni (1837–1900), an Italian priest born in Montelupo. || 
|-id=593
| 10593 Susannesandra ||  || Susanne Sandness (born 1956), wife of American amateur astronomer Robert G. Sandness, who discovered the minor planet. || 
|-id=596
| 10596 Stevensimpson || 1996 TS || Steven Simpson (born 1958). || 
|-id=598
| 10598 Markrees ||  || Mark B. Rees (born 1963), stepson of the discoverer, Paul G. Comba || 
|}

10601–10700 

|-
| 10601 Hiwatashi || 1996 UC || Kenji Hiwatashi, electrical engineer at NHK (Japan Broadcasting Corporation) from 1947 to 1979. || 
|-id=602
| 10602 Masakazu ||  || Masakazu Kusakabe (born 1946) is a ceramic artist, known for his design of the Smokeless Wood Fire Kiln. || 
|-id=604
| 10604 Susanoo || 1996 VJ || Susanoo-no-mikoto is the Japanese god of heroes and the ancestor soul and a younger brother of the goddess Amaterasu. || 
|-id=605
| 10605 Guidoni ||  || Umberto Guidoni, Italian astronaut † || 
|-id=606
| 10606 Crocco ||  || Gaetano Arturo Crocco, Italian pioneer of aeronautics and space science † || 
|-id=607
| 10607 Amandahatton ||  || Amanda H. Hatton, the discoverer's stepdaughter. || 
|-id=608
| 10608 Mameta ||  || Katsuhiko Mameta (born 1958), secretary of the Astronomical Society of Hyogo since 2000. || 
|-id=609
| 10609 Hirai ||  || Yuzo Hirai, a professor at the Institute of Information Sciences and Electronics. || 
|-id=611
| 10611 Yanjici ||  || Yan Jici (1901–1996) || 
|-id=612
| 10612 Houffalize ||  || Houffalize, Belgium, on the Ourthe River || 
|-id=613
| 10613 Kushinadahime ||  || Kushinadahime, the mythical empress of the god Susanoo-no-mikoto, was offered as a sacrifice to the giant snake Yamata-no-orochi but was saved by the god Susanoo. || 
|-id=616
| 10616 Inouetakeshi ||  || Takeshi Inoue (born 1969) is the astronomy curator of Akashi Municipal Planetarium. || 
|-id=617
| 10617 Takumi ||  || Amateur astronomer Takumi Takahata (born 1941) has created many computer programs that are used for astronomical calculations. || 
|-id=619
| 10619 Ninigi ||  || According to the Japanese myth, the god Ninigi-no-mikoto is a grandson of the goddess Amaterasu. By the order of Amaterasu he descended from the heaven Takamagahara to the peak Takachiho to dominate the land || 
|-id=626
| 10626 Zajíc ||  || Jan Zajíc (born 1910), founder and director of the observatory in Vlašim. || 
|-id=627
| 10627 Ookuninushi ||  || The mythical Japanese god Ookuninushi-no-mikoto created the land, together with the god Sukunabikona-no-mikoto. The name means "king of great land" and is frequently referenced in literature and folklore. A well-known story is that he helped a white rabbit skinned by a shark as retribution for trickery || 
|-id=628
| 10628 Feuerbacher ||  || Berndt Feuerbacher (born 1940), a German physicist, was for two decades head of the Institute of Space Simulation at the German Aerospace Center in Cologne. || 
|-id=633
| 10633 Akimasa ||  || Akimasa Nakamura (born 1961) is a Japanese observer of minor planets and comets. || 
|-id=634
| 10634 Pepibican ||  || Josef "Pepi" Bican (1913–2001), a Czech footballer who represented Austria in 19 and Czechoslovakia in 14 international matches and scored more than 5000 goals in his career. He is considered one of the best center-forward of the century by the International Federation of Soccer Historians and Statisticians. After retirement, Bican developed an interest in astronomy. || 
|-id=637
| 10637 Heimlich ||  || Henry J. Heimlich is an American surgeon who in the early 1970s devised the "Heimlich maneuver", a potentially life-saving procedure for propelling food or other foreign objects up and out of the throat || 
|-id=638
| 10638 McGlothlin ||  || Gerald R. McGlothlin (born 1952) was responsible for refurbishing much of the LONEOS dome, turning a photographic darkroom into a modern control room and computer room. || 
|-id=639
| 10639 Gleason ||  || Arianna Gleason (born 1980) is a student observer with the Spacewatch Project. || 
|-id=642
| 10642 Charmaine ||  || Charmaine Wilkerson (born 1962), wife of the first discoverer, Andrea Boattini, is an American-born writer and broadcaster. She has produced numerous reports on astronomical phenomena and missions. || 
|-id=645
| 10645 Brač ||  || Brač island, Croatia, home of the Pustinja Blaca Observatory ("Blaca Desert" Observatory) || 
|-id=646
| 10646 Machielalberts || 2077 P-L || Machiel Alberts (1909–) was the first astronomer in The Netherlands to succeed, with a home-built camera, to capture a meteor on film. He was actively engaged in meteor observations, as well as in building appliances and instruments for amateur astronomers to enable meteor photography and other types of meteor observation. || 
|-id=647
| 10647 Meesters || 3074 P-L || P. G. Meesters (1887–1964) was a Dutch amateur astronomer. || 
|-id=648
| 10648 Plancius || 4089 P-L || Petrus Plancius (1552–1622) was a Dutch theologian, astronomer, navigator and appointed cartographer to the new Dutch East India Company. Plancius depicted the 12 new southern constellations on a globe he constructed in 1598. || 
|-id=649
| 10649 VOC || 4098 P-L || Verenigde Oostindische Compagnie, Dutch for Dutch East India Company † || 
|-id=650
| 10650 Houtman || 4110 P-L || Frederick de Houtman, Dutch navigator who travelled to the East Indies in 1595 as assistant to Pieter Dirkszoon Keyser † || 
|-id=651
| 10651 van Linschoten || 4522 P-L || Jan Huyghen van Linschoten, Dutch cartographer and spy for the Dutch East India Company † || 
|-id=652
| 10652 Blaeu || 4599 P-L || Willem Janszoon Blaeu, Dutch cartographer and hydrographer for the Dutch East India Company † || 
|-id=653
| 10653 Witsen || 6030 P-L || Nicolaas Witsen, Dutch mayor of Amsterdam and member of the board of the Dutch East India Company † || 
|-id=654
| 10654 Bontekoe || 6673 P-L || Willem Ysbrandtszoon Bontekoe || 
|-id=655
| 10655 Pietkeyser || 9535 P-L || Pieter Dirkszoon Keyser, Dutch navigator who travelled to the East Indies in 1595 with Frederik de Houtman as his assistant † || 
|-id=656
| 10656 Albrecht || 2213 T-1 || Carl Theodor Albrecht (1843–1915), German astronomer and geodesist, first director of the International Latitude Service. || 
|-id=657
| 10657 Wanach || 2251 T-1 || Bernhard Karl Wanach (1867–1928), a Latvian-born astronomer and geodesist. || 
|-id=658
| 10658 Gretadevries || 2281 T-1 || Greta de Vries (1967–2006) was the assistant to the director of the Kapteyn Astronomical Institute in Groningen. || 
|-id=659
| 10659 Sauerland || 3266 T-1 || The Sauerland, a German rural region, has fairly high mountains, such as Kahler Asten at 840 m, and is partly a nature reserve. It lies just east of the German industrial Rhine-Ruhr region. The area is frequented by hikers during summer and by skiers and tobogganers during winter. || 
|-id=660
| 10660 Felixhormuth || 4348 T-1 || Felix Hormuth (born 1975), German astronomer || 
|-id=661
| 10661 Teutoburgerwald || 1211 T-2 || The Teutoburg Forest of Germany, where Varus was defeated by Arminius, chief of the Cherusci, a Teutonic tribe.  || 
|-id=662
| 10662 Peterwisse || 3201 T-2 || Peter Wisse, Dutch curator of the "Museon", the Dutch Center for educational exhibitions || 
|-id=663
| 10663 Schwarzwald || 4283 T-2 || The Black Forest (Schwarzwald) in Germany. It lies east of the Rhine river and extends from Basel as far as the city of Baden-Baden. Up to the timber line at about 1200 m, its vegetation consists mainly of fir and spruce. || 
|-id=664
| 10664 Phemios || 5187 T-2 || Phemios, a character in The Oddysey || 
|-id=665
| 10665 Ortigão || 3019 T-3 || Catarina Ortigão (born 1974) is a Portuguese-born scientist working in the field of medical physics. || 
|-id=666
| 10666 Feldberg || 4171 T-3 || The Feldberg is the highest mountain (1490 m) of the Schwarzwald. || 
|-id=667
| 10667 van Marxveldt || 1975 UA || Cissy van Marxveldt (Setske de Haan), 19th–20th-century Dutch writer, author of the humorous Joop ter Heul novels for teenage girls; Anne Frank addressed her diary letters to an imaginary friend based on one of van Marxveldt's characters || 
|-id=668
| 10668 Plansos ||  || The discoverer's grandchildren: Pandora Mae Honiara (born 2000), Noël Richard (born 2000), Alexander Richard (born 2001), Orlando Harry Tengis (born 2002), Samuel Philip (born 2004), Salomé Olivia Lindsay (born 2005), Lidia Philipa (born 2007). The name is an anagram of the first name initials. || 
|-id=669
| 10669 Herfordia || 1977 FN || Herford, a town in what is sometimes called "Eastern Westfalia". || 
|-id=670
| 10670 Seminozhenko ||  || Ukrainian physicist Vladimir Petrovich Seminozhenko (born 1950) is known for his research on the kinetics of excitation in superconductors and semiconductors and on high-temperature superconductivity || 
|-id=671
| 10671 Mazurova ||  || Ekaterina Yakovlevna Mazurova (1900–1995) was a Russian actress who worked in Moscow theaters and played many roles in films. || 
|-id=672
| 10672 Kostyukova || 1978 QE || Tatiana Andreevna Kostyukova (born 1957) is a botanist and cultivator of flowers in Kyiv. Her collection of flowers won a diploma at the 2001 Moscow Autumn Flower Show || 
|-id=673
| 10673 Berezhnoy ||  || Alexey A. Berezhnoy (born 1972) is a Russian chemist and astronomer at Moscow State University studying chemical processes during the interaction of meteoroids with planetary atmospheres and surfaces, including the lunar exosphere. || 
|-id=674
| 10674 de Elía ||  || Gonzalo Carlos de Elía (born 1977) is an Argentine astronomer at La Plata National University who studies the formation and evolution of planetary systems. || 
|-id=675
| 10675 Kharlamov ||  || Valerij Borisovich Kharlamov (1948–1981), Russian ice hockey player. || 
|-id=676
| 10676 Jamesmcdanell ||  || James P. McDanell (born 1937) spent nearly three decades with the Jet Propulsion Laboratory before retiring in 1999. He was the Voyager Navigation Team Chief during the successful encounters with Saturn and its satellites. He subsequently became manager of the Navigation Systems Section || 
|-id=677
| 10677 Colucci ||  || Adrian Rodriguez Colucci (born 1978) is an astronomer at the Valongo Observatory of Rio de Janeiro, Brazil. He is a specialist in tidal evolution of planets and small bodies. || 
|-id=678
| 10678 Alilagoa ||  || Victor Alí-Lagoa (born 1983) is a Spanish astronomer whose PhD research at the Instituto de Astrofísica de Canarias focused on the thermal properties of small bodies. || 
|-id=679
| 10679 Chankaochang ||  || Chan-Kao "Rex" Chang (born 1976) is a researcher at the National Central University of Taiwan whose work includes searching for fast-rotating asteroids in Palomar Transient Factory survey data and rotation rate distribution studies. || 
|-id=680
| 10680 Ermakov ||  || Anton Ermakov (born 1988) is a postdoctoral researcher at the California Institute of Technology who studies the gravity and interior structures of Vesta and Ceres using Dawn spacecraft data. || 
|-id=681
| 10681 Khture ||  || The Kharkiv Technical University of Radioelectronics, founded in 1930. || 
|-id=683
| 10683 Carter || 1980 LY || Carter Worth Roberts (born 1946), president of the Eastbay Astronomical Society. He collaborated on a safe solar-eclipse-viewing booklet and helped restore "Rachel", the 0.5-m Brashear refractor for the Chabot Space and Science Center || 
|-id=684
| 10684 Babkina ||  || Nadezhda Georgievna Babkina (born 1950) || 
|-id=685
| 10685 Kharkivuniver || 1980 VO || V. N. Karazin Kharkiv National University (В. Н. Каразіна Харківський Національний Університет) of Ukraine || 
|-id=686
| 10686 Kaluna ||  || Heather Kaluna (born 1984) is a researcher at the University of Hawaii studying the evolution of water in carbonaceous asteroids as well as space weathering processes. || 
|-id=688
| 10688 Haghighipour || 1981 DK || Nader Haghighipour (born 1967) is a professor at the University of Hawaii specializing in solar system dynamics as well as extrasolar planets. || 
|-id=689
| 10689 Pinillaalonso ||  || Noemi Pinilla-Alonso (born 1971) is a planetary scientist at the Florida Space Institute who specializes in the study of surface compositions of minor solar system bodies using observational techniques and modeling. || 
|-id=690
| 10690 Massera ||  || José Luis Massera (1915–2002), a Uruguayan mathematician who studied the stability of differential equations. Massera's Lemma solves the equilibrium stability problem in nonlinear differential equations in terms of the Lyapunov function. || 
|-id=691
| 10691 Sans ||  || Juan Diego Sans (1922–2005) was a Uruguayan professor and public communicator of astronomy at the Universidad de la Republica. He was co-founder of the Asociación de Aficionados a la Astronomía and president of the Sociedad Uruguaya de Astronomía. || 
|-id=692
| 10692 Opeil ||  || Cyril P. Opeil SJ (born 1960) is a professor at Boston College studying the thermal properties of meteorites to improve understanding of orbital and rotational changes caused by the re-radiation of solar flux. || 
|-id=693
| 10693 Zangari ||  || Amanda M. Zangari (born 1986) is a postdoctoral researcher at Southwest Research Institute (Boulder, Colorado) whose studies include photometry and stellar occultations of the Pluto system and other Kuiper belt objects. || 
|-id=694
| 10694 Lacerda ||  || Pedro Lacerda (born 1975) is a lecturer at Queen's University Belfast whose work includes analyzing rotational lightcurves to infer physical properties of trans-Neptunian objects and other small solar system bodies. || 
|-id=695
| 10695 Yasunorifujiwara ||  || Yasunori Fujiwara (born 1957) is known for his study of the Leonid meteor stream. || 
|-id=696
| 10696 Giuliattiwinter ||  || Silvia Maria Giuliatti Winter (born 1965) is a Brazilian astronomer at the São Paulo State University working on ring dynamics and the dynamics of the Pluto system. || 
|-id=697
| 10697 Othonwinter ||  || Othon Cabo Winter (born 1963) is a Brazilian astronomer at the São Paulo State University researching orbital dynamics with application to the stability of multiple asteroid systems. || 
|-id=698
| 10698 Singer ||  || Kelsi N. Singer (born 1984) is a postdoctoral researcher at Southwest Research Institute (Boulder, Colorado) studying outer solar system icy satellites and the Kuiper belt population through the crater size distribution revealed by the New Horizons mission to the Pluto system. || 
|-id=699
| 10699 Calabrese ||  || Pietro Calabrese (1944–2010) was editor of the Italian newspapers Il Messaggero and La Gazzetta dello Sport. He was interested in communicating with extraterrestrial intelligence. || 
|-id=700
| 10700 Juanangelviera ||  || Juan Angel Viera (1925–2012) was an amateur astronomer, high-school teacher in astronomy and a communicator in Uruguay. He was Honorary President and co-founder of the Asociación de Aficionados a la Astronomía. || 
|}

10701–10800 

|-
| 10701 Marilynsimons || 1981 PF || Marilyn Hawrys Simons (born 1951) is an American economist and philanthropist. || 
|-id=702
| 10702 Arizorcas || 1981 QD || The Arizona Orchestra Association represents Arizona's forty-one orchestras. || 
|-id=707
| 10707 Prunariu ||  || Dumitru Prunariu (born 1952 ) became the first Romanian cosmonaut flying in 1981 aboard Soyuz 40 to the Salyut 6 space laboratory. He is one of the proposal initiators for International Asteroid Day (June 30) declared by the UN General Assembly. || 
|-id=708
| 10708 Richardspalding ||  || Richard Spalding (born 1935) is an engineer at Sandia National Laboratories whose satellite projects include the detection of Gamma Ray Bursts and transient atmospheric phenomena generated by lightning and meteors. || 
|-id=709
| 10709 Ottofranz ||  || Otto G. Franz (born 1931), a Lowell Observatory astronomer. || 
|-id=711
| 10711 Pskov ||  || Pskov, a Russian city on the Velikaya River near the Estonian border || 
|-id=712
| 10712 Malashchuk ||  || Valentina Mikhailovna Malashchuk (born 1947), accountant general of the Crimean Astrophysical Observatory || 
|-id=713
| 10713 Limorenko ||  || Leonid Pavlovich Limorenko (born 1951), assistant director of the Crimean Astrophysical Observatory. || 
|-id=715
| 10715 Nagler ||  || Al Nagler (born 1935), an optical designer involved in NASA's Gemini and Apollo missions || 
|-id=716
| 10716 Olivermorton || 1983 WQ || Oliver Morton (born 1965). || 
|-id=717
| 10717 Dickwalker || 1983 XC || Richard Walker (a.k.a. Dick Walker; 1938–2005), American astronomer at USNO and discoverer of Epimetheus || 
|-id=718
| 10718 Samusʹ ||  || Nikolaj Nikolaevich Samusʹ (born 1949) is a scientist in stellar astrophysics at the Institute of Astronomy of the Russian Academy of Sciences and Moscow University. || 
|-id=719
| 10719 Andamar || 1985 TW || Anne Marren (born 1944) and David Marren (born 1953), friends of American discoverer Edward L. G. Bowell || 
|-id=720
| 10720 Danzl || 1986 GY || Nichole M. Danzl, American amateur astronomer, former Spacewatch Observer and discoverer of minor planets || 
|-id=721
| 10721 Tuterov ||  || Vladimir Lukich Tuterov (born 1960). || 
|-id=722
| 10722 Monari || 1986 TB || Luisa Monari (born 1961), wife of Italian co-discoverer Ermes Colombini || 
|-id=724
| 10724 Carolraymond ||  || Carol A. Raymond (born 1960), a scientist at the Jet Propulsion Laboratory || 
|-id=725
| 10725 Sukunabikona || 1986 WB || Sukunabikona, the Japanese god of a naughty character || 
|-id=726
| 10726 Elodie ||  || Élodie Bouteille (born 1990), a French student at the Lycée Diderot || 
|-id=727
| 10727 Akitsushima || 1987 DN || Jinmu (Akitsushima), the first emperor of Japan according to legend || 
|-id=728
| 10728 Vladimirfock ||  || Vladimir Fock (1898–1974), a Russian physicist || 
|-id=729
| 10729 Tsvetkova ||  || Valentina Petrovna Tsvetkova (1917–), a Russian artist || 
|-id=730
| 10730 White || 1987 SU || Nathaniel Miller White (born 1941), American astronomer at Lowell Observatory || 
|-id=733
| 10733 Georgesand ||  || George Sand (1804–1876), French writer. || 
|-id=734
| 10734 Wieck ||  || Clara Josephine Wieck (1819–1896). || 
|-id=735
| 10735 Seine ||  || The Seine, a major river in France, which passes the cities of Troyes, Paris and Rouen, before ending at the English Channel near Le Havre || 
|-id=736
| 10736 Marybrück ||  || Mary Brück (1925–2011), an Irish astronomer. || 
|-id=737
| 10737 Brück ||  || Hermann Brück (1905–2000), a German-born astronomer in the UK || 
|-id=738
| 10738 Marcoaldo ||  || Marco Aldo Ferreri (born 1981), son of Italian discoverer Walter Ferreri || 
|-id=739
| 10739 Lowman ||  || Margaret D. Lowman (born 1953). || 
|-id=740
| 10740 Fallersleben ||  || August Heinrich Hoffmann von Fallersleben (1798–1874), a German poet and philologist || 
|-id=741
| 10741 Valeriocarruba ||  || Valerio Carruba (born 1970) is an astronomer at the São Paulo State University in Brazil whose research includes the dynamics and identification of asteroid families and the effect of non-linear secular resonances in the asteroid belt. || 
|-id=744
| 10744 Tsuruta || 1988 XO || Masatoshi Tsuruta (born 1938), president of the Saga Astronomical Society since 1998. || 
|-id=745
| 10745 Arnstadt ||  || Arnstadt, a town in Thuringia with a 1300-year history. || 
|-id=746
| 10746 Mühlhausen ||  || Mühlhausen || 
|-id=747
| 10747 Köthen ||  || Köthen, a German town in Saxony-Anhalt || 
|-id=749
| 10749 Musäus ||  || Johann Karl August Musäus (1735–1787), a private tutor at the court of Weimar. || 
|-id=753
| 10753 van de Velde ||  || Henry van de Velde (1863–1957), a Belgian painter, architect and interior designer || 
|-id=758
| 10758 Aldoushuxley ||  || Aldous Leonard Huxley (1894–1963), an English writer || 
|-id=760
| 10760 Ozeki ||  || Takaaki Ozeki (born 1952), previously a teacher of science, is now astronomy curator of the Hoshinoko Yakata Observatory. || 
|-id=761
| 10761 Lyubimets ||  || Grigorij (born 2000), grandson of the Crimean astronomer Lyudmila Karachkina. || 
|-id=762
| 10762 von Laue ||  || Max von Laue (1879–1960), student of Planck, discovered the diffraction of x-rays in crystals, thereby permitting their structural analysis. For this he received the 1914 Nobel Prize in physics. || 
|-id=763
| 10763 Hlawka ||  || Edmund Hlawka (1916–2009), Austrian mathematician. || 
|-id=764
| 10764 Rübezahl ||  || Rübezahl, a fairy tale figure in German, Polish, and Czech folklore || 
|-id=767
| 10767 Toyomasu ||  || Shinji Toyomasu (born 1967) is a research fellow of the Misato Observatory. || 
|-id=768
| 10768 Sarutahiko ||  || Sarutahiko Ōkami, a Japanese Shinto deity and guardian of Earth || 
|-id=769
| 10769 Minas Gerais ||  || Minas Gerais, a Brazilian state || 
|-id=770
| 10770 Belo Horizonte ||  || Belo Horizonte, capital city of the Brazilian state of Minas Gerais || 
|-id=771
| 10771 Ouro Prêto ||  || Ouro Preto, ancient capital of the Brazilian state of Minas Gerais || 
|-id=773
| 10773 Jamespaton ||  || James Paton (1903–1973), a Scottish meteorologist. || 
|-id=774
| 10774 Eisenach ||  || Eisenach a town in Thuringia, Germany . || 
|-id=775
| 10775 Leipzig ||  || Leipzig, largest city of Saxony, Germany || 
|-id=776
| 10776 Musashitomiyo ||  || Musashitomiyo ("minor stickleback"; Pungitius sp.), a rare freshwater fish, seen only in Japan's Kumagawa River || 
|-id=778
| 10778 Marcks ||  || Gerhard Marcks (1889–1981), sculptor and graphic artist. || 
|-id=780
| 10780 Apollinaire ||  || Guillaume Apollinaire (1880–1918), a French poet || 
|-id=781
| 10781 Ritter ||  || Johann Wilhelm Ritter (1776–1810), German chemist, physicist and philosopher || 
|-id=782
| 10782 Hittmair ||  || Otto Hittmair (born 1924), an Austrian theoretical physicist. || 
|-id=784
| 10784 Noailles ||  || Anna de Noailles (1876–1933), the daughter of a Romanian prince and granddaughter of a Turkish pasha. || 
|-id=785
| 10785 Dejaiffe ||  || René Dejaiffe (born 1940), a Belgian astronomer || 
|-id=786
| 10786 Robertmayer ||  || Julius Robert Mayer (1814–1878), a German doctor and naturalist. || 
|-id=787
| 10787 Ottoburkard ||  || Otto M. Burkard (born 1908), an Austrian professor emeritus of meteorology and geophysics of the University of Graz || 
|-id=789
| 10789 Mikeread ||  || Michael T. Read (born 1978) is a student working as an observer and engineer at Spacewatch. He discovered comets 238P/Read and 344P/Read. || 
|-id=791
| 10791 Uson || 1992 CS || Uson Morishita (1890–1965), born in Sagawa, Kochi prefecture. || 
|-id=792
| 10792 Ecuador ||  || Ecuador, the South American country. || 
|-id=793
| 10793 Quito ||  || Quito, the capital city of Ecuador. || 
|-id=794
| 10794 Vänge ||  || Vänge, a settlement on the Swedish island of Gotland. || 
|-id=795
| 10795 Babben ||  || Babben Larsson (born 1956), a Swedish actress, singer and comedian. || 
|-id=796
| 10796 Sollerman ||  || Jesper Sollerman (born 1968), a Swedish astronomer at Stockholm University, who researches supernovae, pulsars, and gamma-ray bursts. || 
|-id=797
| 10797 Guatemala ||  || Guatemala, the Central American country. || 
|-id=799
| 10799 Yucatán ||  || The Mexican Yucatán Peninsula. || 
|}

10801–10900 

|-
| 10801 Lüneburg ||  || Lüneburg, one of the richest Hanse towns, more than 1000 years old. || 
|-id=802
| 10802 Masamifuruya ||  || Masami Furuya (born 1973), a research fellow at the Kawabe Observatory of Kawabe Cosmic Park. || 
|-id=803
| 10803 Caléyo ||  || Jose M. Caréyo (born 1938), a jazz composer living in Havana. || 
|-id=804
| 10804 Amenouzume ||  || Amenouzume is the mythical Japanese goddess who managed to free the goddess Amaterasu by dancing in front of the rock door when she shut herself up in the cave Ama-no-iwayado. After that Amenouzume descended from heaven, following the god Ninigi-no-mikoto. || 
|-id=805
| 10805 Iwano ||  || Hisaka Iwano (born 1957), an engineer and amateur astronomer in Japan || 
|-id=806
| 10806 Mexico ||  || Mexico, a country in the southern part of North America || 
|-id=807
| 10807 Uggarde ||  || Uggarde rojr, cairn on Gotland island, Sweden || 
|-id=808
| 10808 Digerrojr ||  || Digerrojr, cairn on Gotland island, Sweden || 
|-id=809
| 10809 Majsterrojr ||  || Majsterrojr, cairn on Gotland island, Sweden || 
|-id=810
| 10810 Lejsturojr ||  || Lejstu rojr, cairn on Gotland island, Sweden || 
|-id=811
| 10811 Lau ||  || Lau, Gotland, socken on southern Gotland island, Sweden || 
|-id=812
| 10812 Grötlingbo ||  || Grötlingbo, socken on Gotland island, Sweden || 
|-id=813
| 10813 Mästerby ||  || Mästerby, socken on Gotland island, Sweden || 
|-id=814
| 10814 Gnisvärd ||  || Gnisvärd is a small fishing village on Gotland.  || 
|-id=815
| 10815 Östergarn ||  || Östergarn || 
|-id=819
| 10819 Mahakala || 1993 HG || Mahakala, or "Great Time", is one of the destructive aspects of Shiva in Vedic Hinduism † || 
|-id=820
| 10820 Offenbach ||  || Jacques Offenbach (1819–1880), a German-French composer. || 
|-id=821
| 10821 Kimuratakeshi || 1993 SZ || Takeshi Kimura (born 1943). || 
|-id=822
| 10822 Yasunori ||  || Yasunori Harada (born 1971), a research engineer and amateur astronomer in Japan. || 
|-id=823
| 10823 Sakaguchi ||  || Naoto Sakaguchi (born 1962), an amateur astronomer. || 
|-id=825
| 10825 Augusthermann ||  || August Hermann Francke (1663–1727), a German theologian and pedagogue. || 
|-id=827
| 10827 Doikazunori ||  || azunori Doi (born 1952), a Japanese architect and amateur astronomer. || 
|-id=828
| 10828 Tomjones ||  || Thomas D. Jones (born 1955), a planetary scientist. || 
|-id=829
| 10829 Matsuobasho || 1993 UU || Matsuo Basho (1644–1694). || 
|-id=830
| 10830 Desforges ||  || Jacques Desforges(fr) (1723–1791), a French priest at Étampes || 
|-id=831
| 10831 Takamagahara ||  || Takamagahara was the heaven that appears in Japanese ancient myth. The place was ruled by the goddess Amaterasu. || 
|-id=832
| 10832 Hazamashigetomi ||  || Hazama Shigetomi (1756–1816), an astronomer in the Japanese Edo period who studied positional astronomy. || 
|-id=834
| 10834 Zembsch-Schreve ||  || Guido Zembsch-Schreve (born 1916), a Dutch secret agent. || 
|-id=835
| 10835 Fröbel ||  || Friedrich Fröbel (1782–1852), a Thuringian pedagogue. In 1839 he founded the first nursery school, which he named Kindergarten. || 
|-id=837
| 10837 Yuyakekoyake ||  || Yuyakekoyake, popular Japanese nursery rhyme || 
|-id=838
| 10838 Lebon ||  || Gustave Le Bon (1841–1931), a French social psychologist. || 
|-id=839
| 10839 Hufeland ||  || Christoph Wilhelm Hufeland, German physician. || 
|-id=841
| 10841 Ericforbes ||  || Eric Gray Forbes (1933–1984), a professor and director of the History of Medicine and Science Unit at Edinburgh University. || 
|-id=847
| 10847 Koch ||  || Heinrich Hermann Robert Koch, German physician and Nobelist. || 
|-id=850
| 10850 Denso ||  || Named for Denso Corporation, for which the discoverer worked for eight years as an electrical engineer. || 
|-id=853
| 10853 Aimoto || 1995 CW || Minoru Aimoto (born 1965), a senior researcher at Saji Observatory, is in charge of astronomical exhibitions and astronomical lectures for visitors to the observatory. || 
|-id=856
| 10856 Bechstein ||  || Carl Bechstein (1826–1900), born in the Thuringian town of Gotha, founded a piano factory in Berlin in 1853. || 
|-id=857
| 10857 Blüthner ||  || Julius Blüthner (1824–1910) founded a piano factory in Leipzig in 1853. || 
|-id=861
| 10861 Ciske ||  || Ciske Staring was a courier in Amsterdam for the Dutch resistance during World War II. || 
|-id=863
| 10863 Oye ||  || Jacob and Martha Oye are the grandparents of Paul Kervin, AMOS technical director. || 
|-id=864
| 10864 Yamagatashi ||  || The city of Yamagata, in the center of Yamagata prefecture. || 
|-id=865
| 10865 Thelmaruby ||  || Thelma Ruby is a British actress. || 
|-id=866
| 10866 Peru ||  || Peru, on the west coast of South America. || 
|-id=867
| 10867 Lima ||  || Lima, Peru. || 
|-id=870
| 10870 Gwendolen ||  || Mary Gwendolen Ellery Read Aikman, the discoverer's mother † || 
|-id=872
| 10872 Vaculík ||  || Ludvík Vaculík, Czech writer and journalist † || 
|-id=874
| 10874 Locatelli ||  || Pietro Antonio Locatelli, Italian violinist and composer † || 
|-id=875
| 10875 Veracini ||  || Francesco Maria Veracini, Italian violinist and composer † || 
|-id=877
| 10877 Jiangnan Tianchi || 1996 UR || Jiang Nan Tian Chi, an observation station in Eastern China. || 
|-id=878
| 10878 Moriyama || 1996 VV || Moriyama, a city on east side of Lake Biwa, the largest lake in Japan, in Shiga Prefecture. || 
|-id=880
| 10880 Kaguya ||  || SELENE, a lunar explorer developed by the Japan Aerospace Exploration Agency (JAXA), nicknamed Kaguya after a Japanese folktale character || 
|-id=882
| 10882 Shinonaga ||  || Kouji Shinonaga (born 1952), the director of Kamagari Observatory since 1991. || 
|-id=884
| 10884 Tsuboimasaki ||  || Masaki Tsuboi (born 1954), the president of the Hiroshima Astronomical Society and a leader of the amateur astronomy community in western Japan. || 
|-id=885
| 10885 Horimasato ||  || Masato Hori (born 1957), is a specialist in civil engineering and a member of the Hiroshima Astronomical Society. || 
|-id=886
| 10886 Mitsuroohba ||  || Mitsuro Ohba, Japanese polar adventurer. || 
|-id=888
| 10888 Yamatano-orochi ||  || Yamatano-orochi is a giant snake appearing in Japanese ancient mythology. The snake had eight heads and eight tails and was long enough to cover eight valleys and eight peaks. It was defeated by the god Susanoo-no-mikoto. || 
|-id=891
| 10891 Fink ||  || Uwe Fink (born 1939) || 
|-id=892
| 10892 Gianna ||  || Gianna Petean (born 1958).  || 
|-id=894
| 10894 Nakai ||  || R. Carlos Nakai, musician and cultural anthropologist of Navajo-Ute descent † || 
|-id=895
| 10895 Aynrand ||  || Ayn Rand (1905–1982), Russian-born philosopher and writer, emigrated to the United States at age 21. She was the author of several novels and books, including The Fountainhead (1943) and Atlas Shrugged (1957) || 
|-id=900
| 10900 Folkner ||  || William Folkner (born 1956), a principal scientist at the Jet Propulsion Laboratory, is a recognized authority on the planetary ephemerides. || 
|}

10901–11000 

|-id=907
| 10907 Savalle ||  || Renaud Savalle (born 1971), an astronomical software programmer, wrote the CCD acquisition system used by the Asteroid Survey at Caussols that allowed this minor planet to be discovered. || 
|-id=908
| 10908 Kallestroetzel ||  || Karl-Heinz Stroetzel (born 1935) || 
|-id=911
| 10911 Ziqiangbuxi ||  || Originated from I Ching (the Book of Changes), "Zi Qiang Bu Xi" are the Chinese characters for "Unremittingly practicing self-improvement". || 
|-id=914
| 10914 Tucker ||  || Roy Tucker (born 1951), an instrumentalist at Kitt Peak National Observatory, is the owner and chief observer of southern Arizona's Goodricke-Pigott Observatory. || 
|-id=916
| 10916 Okina-Ouna ||  || Okina and Ouna are the two small lunar explorers developed by the Japan Aerospace Exploration Agency. They were separated from the main orbiter of the lunar explorer "KAGUYA (SELENE)" in Oct. 2007. Okina and Ouna are also the foster parents of Kaguya in the old Japanese story Kaguya-hime || 
|-id=918
| 10918 Kodaly ||  || Zoltán Kodály (1882–1967), Hungarian composer || 
|-id=919
| 10919 Pepíkzicha ||  || Josef Zicha (born 1939) was the head engineer for the 2m telescope at Ondřejov. || 
|-id=921
| 10921 Romanozen ||  || Romano Zen (born 1946), known for his optical instruments. || 
|-id=924
| 10924 Mariagriffin ||  || Maria Anna Griffin (born 1962), wife of the discoverer, Ian P. Griffin || 
|-id=925
| 10925 Ventoux ||  || Mont Ventoux (1909 m) in the French département of Vaucluse (Provence). || 
|-id=927
| 10927 Vaucluse ||  || Vaucluse is a French département. || 
|-id=928
| 10928 Caprara ||  || Giovanni Caprara (born 1948) is the science and space editor of Il Corriere della Sera. || 
|-id=929
| 10929 Chenfangyun ||  || Chen Fangyun (1916–2000). || 
|-id=930
| 10930 Jinyong ||  || Jin Yong (pen-name of Louis Cha), Chinese writer || 
|-id=931
| 10931 Ceccano || 1998 DA || Ceccano, where the discovery observations of this minor planet were made. || 
|-id=932
| 10932 Rebentrost ||  || David Rebentrost (1614–1703), a vicar, doctor and herbalist in Drebach. || 
|-id=934
| 10934 Pauldelvaux ||  || Paul Delvaux (1897–1994) was a Belgian Surrealist painter. || 
|-id=937
| 10937 Ferris ||  || William D. Ferris (born 1961), a video producer-director at Northern Arizona University. || 
|-id=938
| 10938 Lorenzalevy ||  || Lorenza Levy (born 1976), an observer for LONEOS since mid–1999. || 
|-id=943
| 10943 Brunier ||  || Serge Brunier (born 1958). || 
|-id=947
| 10947 Kaiserstuhl || 2061 P-L || The Kaiserstuhl (570 m) is an old volcanic mountain range between the Schwarzwald and the Rhine river. It has one of the mildest climates in Germany. Since Roman times the slopes of the mountains have been covered with vineyards, producing the well-known wine "Kaiserstühler". || 
|-id=948
| 10948 Odenwald || 2207 P-L || The Odenwald is a mountain range in Germany between the Main and Neckar rivers, east of the Rhine river. Heidelberg is located in the southern part of the Odenwald. Its summits are Königstuhl and Melibokus. || 
|-id=949
| 10949 Königstuhl || 3066 P-L || The Königstuhl, second highest mountain of the Odenwald range of Germany, site of the Landessternwarte Heidelberg-Königstuhl and the Max-Planck-Institut für Astronomie || 
|-id=950
| 10950 Albertjansen || 4049 P-L || Albert Jansen (1940–2004)|| 
|-id=951
| 10951 Spessart || 4050 P-L || The Spessart, a small chain of mountains surrounded by the river Main on three sides in Germany. It is part of the mountains east of the Rhine, which extend from Basel in the south to Frankfurt in the north. || 
|-id=952
| 10952 Vogelsberg || 4152 P-L || Vogelsberg Mountains, a volcanic mountain range in German || 
|-id=953
| 10953 Gerdatschira || 4276 P-L || Gerda Tschira (born 1943), German founder and director of the Carl Bosch museum, Heidelberg || 
|-id=954
| 10954 Spiegel || 4545 P-L || Beate Spiegel (born 1960), German head of the office of the Klaus Tschira Foundation || 
|-id=955
| 10955 Harig || 5011 P-L || Ludwig Harig (born 1927) is a German writer. || 
|-id=956
| 10956 Vosges || 5023 P-L || The Vosges (1420 m) mountain range extends west of the Rhine in France, opposite the German Schwarzwald mountains. || 
|-id=957
| 10957 Alps || 6068 P-L || The Alps form a mountain chain stretching from the Mediterranean Sea between southern France and Italy through Switzerland to eastern Austria. || 
|-id=958
| 10958 Mont Blanc || 6188 P-L || Mont Blanc (4800 m), in the French-Italian Alps, is the highest mountain in Europe. || 
|-id=959
| 10959 Appennino || 6579 P-L || The Apennine Mountains is a mountain range that extends for the whole length of Italy, a 1400-km stretch from the Gulf of Genoa to the Strait of Messina. || 
|-id=960
| 10960 Gran Sasso || 6580 P-L || Gran Sasso (2910 m) is the highest mountain of the Apennines, Italy. || 
|-id=961
| 10961 Buysballot || 6809 P-L || C. H. D. Buys Ballot (1817–1890), Dutch meteorologist, described Buys Ballot's law describing the turning of the winds in northern and southern hemispheres. He founded the Astronomical Institute at the University of Utrecht (Sonnenborgh) in 1853 and the Royal Netherlands Meteorological Institute in 1854. || 
|-id=962
| 10962 Sonnenborgh || 9530 P-L || Sonnenborgh Observatory in Utrecht, founded in 1853 by Buys Ballot, specializes in the study of the sun. || 
|-id=963
| 10963 van der Brugge || 2088 T-1 || Aad H. van der Brugge, a Dutch amateur astronomer and member of the Royal Netherlands Association for Meteorology and Astronomy || 
|-id=964
| 10964 Degraaff || 3216 T-1 || Willem de Graaff (1923–2004), was a Dutch astronomical researcher and lecturer at Utrecht University. || 
|-id=965
| 10965 van Leverink || 3297 T-1 || Simon van Leverink (born 1947), member of the Working Group on Meteors of the Royal Netherlands Meteorological and Astronomical Society. || 
|-id=966
| 10966 van der Hucht || 3308 T-1 || Karel A. van der Hucht (born 1946), a Dutch astronomer who was appointed Assistant General Secretary of the International Astronomical Union in 2003 || 
|-id=967
| 10967 Billallen || 4349 T-1 || William H. Allen (born 1939), a New Zealand amateur astronomer and electrical engineer. || 
|-id=968
| 10968 Sterken || 4393 T-1 || Christiaan Sterken (born 1946), a Belgian astronomer, Research Director of the Belgian Fund For Scientific Research, and co-founder of the Journal of Astronomical Data || 
|-id=969
| 10969 Perryman || 4827 T-1 || Michael Perryman (born 1954), British project scientist and scientific leader of the HIPPARCOS and GAIA astrometry missions of the European Space Agency || 
|-id=970
| 10970 de Zeeuw || 1079 T-2 || Tim de Zeeuw (born 1956), a Dutch astronomer at Leiden Observatory and Director General of the European Southern Observatory (ESO) since 2007. He is the husband of Ewine van Dishoeck (see (10971)) || 
|-id=971
| 10971 van Dishoeck || 1179 T-2 || Ewine van Dishoeck (born 1955), a Dutch astronomer at Leiden Observatory || 
|-id=972
| 10972 Merbold || 1188 T-2 || Ulf Merbold (born 1941), a German astronaut and Spacelab module specialists of the U.S. Space Shuttle || 
|-id=973
| 10973 Thomasreiter || 1210 T-2 || Thomas Reiter (born 1958), a German astronaut who stayed on both the Russian Mir Space Station and the ISS || 
|-id=974
| 10974 Carolalbert || 2225 T-2 || Carol Handahl and Albert O. Grender, aunt and uncle of D. W. E. Green, who made the identifications involving this object. || 
|-id=975
| 10975 Schelderode || 2246 T-2 || Schelderode is an agrarian village founded in the tenth century and located along the river Schelde in Flanders, Belgium. It has been the workplace and residence of Belgian astronomer Christiaan Sterken for more than three decades. || 
|-id=976
| 10976 Wubbena || 2287 T-2 || Eltjo Wubbena (born 1947) was president of the NVWS, the Dutch popular-astronomy society, from 1975 to 1985. || 
|-id=977
| 10977 Mathlener || 3177 T-2 || Edwin Mathlener (born 1962), Dutch astronomy amateur, director of Dutch astronomy information center "De Koepel" and editor of its magazine "Zenit" and almanac "Sterrengids". || 
|-id=978
| 10978 Bärbchen || 4095 T-2 || Barbara Börngen ("Bärbchen"; 1934–2010) wife of German astronomer and discoverer of minor planets, Freimut Börngen || 
|-id=979
| 10979 Fristephenson || 4171 T-2 || Francis Richard Stephenson (born 1941), a British historian of astronomy. || 
|-id=980
| 10980 Breimer || 4294 T-2 || Douwe Breimer (born 1943), a Dutch pharmacologist and President of Leiden University || 
|-id=981
| 10981 Fransaris || 1148 T-3 || Frans Saris (born 1942), a Dutch atomic and molecular physicist, Dean of Sciences at Leiden University || 
|-id=982
| 10982 Poerink || 2672 T-3 || Urijan Poerink (born 1953), Dutch meteor researcher || 
|-id=983
| 10983 Smolders || 3196 T-3 || Petrus L. L. Smolders (born 1940), Dutch scientist, writer and journalist, spaceflight and astronomy popularizer || 
|-id=984
| 10984 Gispen || 3507 T-3 || Willem Hendrik Gispen (born 1943), a Dutch neuroscientist who contributed to the establishment of the Sonnenborgh museum and observatory. || 
|-id=985
| 10985 Feast || 4017 T-3 || Michael Feast (1926–), a South African astronomer || 
|-id=986
| 10986 Govert || 4313 T-3 || Govert Schilling (born 1956), Dutch amateur astronomer and science writer, journalist, and astronomy popularizer. || 
|-id=988
| 10988 Feinstein || 1968 OL || Alejandro Feinstein (born 1928), an Argentinian astronomer at La Plata Observatory and co-founder of the Argentinian Astronomical Association (Asociación Argentina de Astronomía) || 
|-id=989
| 10989 Dolios ||  || Dolios, the faithful servant of Laertes at Ithaca. || 
|-id=990
| 10990 Okunev ||  || Boris Nikolaevich Okunev (1897–1961), professor at the D. F. Ustinov Mechanical Institute in Leningrad, was a scientist in theoretical mechanics and ballistics. || 
|-id=991
| 10991 Dulov ||  || Viktor Georgievich Dulov (1929–2001), a Russian professor who was known for his work in theoretical gas dynamics and applied mathematics || 
|-id=992
| 10992 Veryuslaviya || 1974 SF || The Chubenko family: Vera Ivanovna (born 1951) and her sons Vyacheslav (born 1973), an astronomer and fanciful writer, and Yury (born 1978). || 
|-id=994
| 10994 Fouchard ||  || Marc Fouchard (born 1972) is a professor at the Laboratoire d´Astronomie de Université Lille and collaborator at the Institut de Mécanique Céleste et de Calcul des Éphémérides (IMCCE) (France), specializing in the dynamics of long-period comets. || 
|-id=996
| 10996 Armandspitz ||  || Armand Spitz (1904–1971), was an American planetarium designer. || 
|-id=997
| 10997 Gahm ||  || Gösta Gahm (born 1942), Swedish astronomer at Stockholm Observatory || 
|-id=999
| 10999 Braga-Ribas ||  || Felipe Braga-Ribas (born 1982) is a professor at the Federal Technological University of Paraná, Curitiba (Brazil) specializing in predictions and observations of stellar occultations, including the detection of rings around the centaur (10199) Chariklo. || 
|}

References 

010001-011000